= List of Chinese women artists =

This is a list of women artists who were born in China or whose artworks are closely associated with that country.

== A ==
- A Ge (born 1948), print-maker, also known as Deng Mingying
- Au Hoi Lam (born 1978), painter

== B ==
- Bingyi (born 1975), painter
- Bu Hua (born 1973), digital artist

== C ==
- Cai Han (1647-1686), landscape painter
- Cai Jin (born 1965), painter
- Cai Lanying (1918-2005), paper-cut artist
- Cai Weilian (1904–1939), painter
- Cao Fei (born 1978), multimedia artist
- Cao Miaoqing (14th Century), poet, calligrapher, and musician
- Cao Yu (born 1988), visual artist
- Cao Zhenxiu (active late 18th Century), poet, painter, calligrapher
- Chai Jingyi (17th Century), poet, painter
- Queenie Chan (born 1980), comics artist
- Chien-Ying Chang (1913-2004), painter, active mainly in Britain
- Chang Ch'ung-ho or Zhang Chonghe (1914–2015), Chinese-American poet, painter, calligrapher
- CIL Chen (born 1963), artist
- Georgette Chen (1906-1993), Chinese-Singaporean modern art painter
- Chen Jin (1907-1998), first Taiwanese painter to achieve national recognition
- Chen Ke (born 1978), painter
- Chen Man (born 1980), visual artist
- Movana Chen (born 1975), paper knitting artist
- Chen Peiqiu (1922-2020), best-selling woman painter of her day
- Chen Shu (1660–1736), Qing dynasty painter
- Chen Xiaocui (1902-1967), poet, painter, and calligrapher
- Chen Yanyin (born 1958), sculptor
- Cheng Changwen (Tang Dynasty), poet and calligrapher
- Canal Cheong Jagerroos (born 1968), painter and conceptual artist
- Chinyee (1929-2023), painter
- Choi Yan-chi (born 1949), Hong Kong installation artist
- Irene Chou (1924–2011), calligrapher and painter
- Chow Chung-cheng (1908–1996), finger painter, writer
- Katherine Choy (1927-1958), ceramic artist
- Chung Ching (born 1933), actress, painter
- Sougwen Chung, installation artist
- Cui Xiuwen (1967-2018), oil painter, media artist

== D ==
- Ding Yu (Qing Dynasty), painter
- Dong Xiaowan (1623-1651), painter, poet, and courtesan, also known as Dong Qinglian

== F ==
- Fan Tchunpi (1898–1986), painter and ceramicist
- Fang Wanyi (1732-1779), poet and painter
- Fang Weiyi (1585-1668), poet, painter, anthologist of women's literature
- Fang Zhaoling (1914-2006), painter and calligrapher, also known as Lydia Fong
- Fu Daokun (fl. 1626), painter

== G ==
- Gu Erniang (Qing Dynasty), inkstone artist
- Gu Hengbo (1619-1664), Gējì, poet and painter
- Guan Daosheng (1262–1319), "the most famous female painter in Chinese history."
- Guan Zilan (1903–1986), avant-garde painter, also known as Violet Kwan
- Guo Yingguang (born 1983), photographer

== H ==
- Han Ximeng (1573–1644), Ming dynasty silk embroiderer
- Han Yajuan (born 1980), contemporary artist
- He Chengyao (born 1964), performance artist
- He Xiangning (1878–1972), feminist, politician, painter, poet
- He Zhihong (born 1970), book illustrator
- Hou Bo (1924-2017), photographer
- Hu Jieqing (1905-2001)
- Huang Daopo (c.1245-1330), textile artist

== J ==
- Jiang Jie (born 1965), sculptor
- Jiang Shuo (born 1958), sculptor
- Jidi (born 1983), cartoonist
- Aowen Jin (active since 2010), Chinese-born British artist
- Jin Zhang (1884-1939), painter, calligrapher, also known as Jin Taotao

== K ==
- Kan Xuan (born 1972), visual artist
- Kang Tongbi (1887-1969), daughter of Kang Youwei, better known as a political activist
- Alice Kok (born 1978), visual artist
- Kwan Shan Mei (1922-2012), illustrator

== L ==
- Jun T. Lai (born 1953), sculptor and painter
- Lalan (1921-1995), multidisciplinary artist
- Jaffa Lam (born 1973), contemporary artist
- Jiny Lan (born 1970), visual artist
- Lee Wai Chun (c.1939-2020), comics artist
- Alice Meichi Li, visual artist
- Li Chevalier (born 1961) painting, installation; Chinese-born French artist (诗蓝 in Chinese)
- Yushi Li (born 1991), photographer
- Li Pingxiang (active c.1900), Geji, painter, poet
- Li Shuang (born 1957), contemporary artist
- Li Xiang (born 1952), painter
- Li Xinmo (born 1976), contemporary artist
- Li Yin (c.1610—1685), Ming dynasty Gējì, artist, and poet, also known as Li Shi'an
- Yishan Li (born 1981), illustrator
- Liang Baibo (1911-c.1970), painter, manhua artist
- Liang Xueqing (active early 20th Century)
- Liao Jingwen (1923–2015), calligrapher and curator of the Xu Beihong Memorial Museum
- Pixy Liao (born 1979)
- Lin Fei Fei (born 1988), muralist
- Lin Tianmiao (born 1961), installation artist, textile designer
- Lin Xue (active 17th Century), painter and Gējì, also known as Lin Tiansu
- Lin Yining (1655-c.1730), painter, poet, composer, founding member of the Banana Garden Seven
- Ling Shuhua (1900-1990), Modernist writer and painter
- Beili Liu (born 1974), contemporary visual artist, installation and performance
- Liu Rushi (1618-1664), Gējì, poet, writer and female leader
- Lou Zhenggang (born 1966)
- Lu Xiaoman (1903-1965), painter, poet, opera singer
- Luo Wei (born 1989), contemporary artist
- Luo Yang (born 1984), photographer

== M ==
- Ma Quan (18th Century), bird and flower painter, relative of Ma Yuanyu
- Ma Shouzhen (c.1548–1604), Gējì, painter, poet and playwright, also known as Ma Xianglan
- Mi Na (born 1980), painter
- Miao Ying (born 1985), contemporary artist
- Mok Hing Ling, ink painter
- Marguerite Müller-Yao (1934-2014), painter

== N ==
- Nie Ou (born 1948), painter
- Niu Weiyu (1927-2020), photographer

== P ==
- Pan Yuliang (1895-1977), first women to paint in Western style
- Peng Wei (born 1974), contemporary artist

== Q ==
- Qian Yingying, ceramic artist
- Qiu Ti (1906-1958), Modernist painter
- Qiu Zhu (active 16th Century), painter, daughter of Qiu Ying

== S ==
- Shao Fei (born 1954), painter
- Shao Hua (1938-2008), photographer
- Shen Shou (1874–1921), embroiderer
- Shen Yuan (born 1959), contemporary artist
- Nancy Sheung (1914-1979), photographer
- Sun Duoci (1912–1975), painter

== T ==
- Tang Ying Chi (born 1958), visual artist
- Mary Tape (1857-1934) civil rights activist, amateur painter and photographer
- Tseng Yu-ho (1924–2017), also known as Betty Ecke

== W ==
- Wang Henei (1912–2000), sculptor, born Renée June-Nikel in Paris
- Xiao Hui Wang, media artist
- Yuhua Shouzhi Wang (born 1966), painter
- Wang Zhaoyuan (1763-1851), scholar and calligrapher
- Wei Ren (born 1978), pottery artist
- Wei Shuo (272-349), calligrapher, teacher of Wang Xizhi
- Wen Shu (1595–1634), painter, great-granddaughter of Wen Zhengming
- Wong Wo Bik, photographer
- Wu Shujuan (1853-1930), painter in the traditional style
- Evan Siu Ping Wu (active since 2012), painter

== X ==
- Xia Da (born 1981), manhua artist
- Xian Yuqing (1895-1965), poet, painter, historian
- Xiang Jing (born 1968), sculptor
- Xiao Lu (born 1962), installation and video artist
- Xiao Zhuang (born 1933), photographer
- Bin Xie (born 1957)
- Xin Fengxia (1927–1998), pingju actress, painter, writer
- Xing Danwen (born 1987), contemporary artist
- Xiong Dun (1982-2012), cartoonist
- Xu Jingyu (born 1981), contemporary artist
- Xue Susu (c.1564–1650), Gējì, painter, poet and Go player

== Y ==
- Yang Meizi (1162-1233), Southern Song Empress, calligrapher, painter
- Yang Ping (born 1956), oil painter
- Yang Ling-fu (1889-1978), painter, novelist, poet
- Yang Wan (c.1602-1644), Gējì poet and calligrapher
- Yin Xiuzhen (born 1963), sculptor and installation artist
- Ying Miao (born 1985), Internet artist
- Yin Xiuzhen (born 1963), installation artist
- Yu Chen (born 1963), contemporary artist
- Yu Feng (1916-2007), cartoonist, painter
- Yu Hong (born 1966), contemporary artist
- Yun Bing (18th Century), granddaughter of Yun Shouping
- Yun Zhu (1771-1833), niece of Yun Bing

== Z ==
- Zhang Huaicun (born 1972), painter, writer and poet
- Zhang Kunyi (1895–1969), painter
- O Zhang (born 1976), contemporary artist
- Zhang Xiaobai (born 1982), comics artist
- Zhou Lianxia (1906-2000), painter, poet
- Zhou Shuxi (1624-1705), painter, renowned in the flower and bird genre
- Zhu Lan Qing (born 1991), photographer
- Zimei (born 1971), multidisciplinary artist, musician

== See also ==
- List of Chinese artists
