= List of Chinese women photographers =

This is a list of women photographers who were born in China or whose works are closely associated with that country.

== C ==
- Chen Man (born 1980), fashion photographer using digital techniques to produce covers for Chinese and international magazines
- Cui Xiuwen (1967–2018), artist producing paintings, videos and photographs

== G ==
- Guo Yingguang (born 1983), projects involving videos and photographs

== H ==
- Hou Bo (1924–2017), portraits (and less formal photographs) of leading officials including Mao Zedong and the founding of the People's Republic in 1949

== L ==
- Yushi Li (born 1991), Chinese-born, London-based photographer whose work is concerned with the male gaze and the female gaze
- Yijun Liao (active since 2008), also known as Pixy Liao, Chinese fine art photographer based in New York
- Liu Xia (born 1961), wife of the Nobel Prize winner Liu Xiaobo, poet, painter, photographer

== P ==
- Joey Pang (born 1979), tattoo artist inspired by Chinese art

== S ==
- Shao Hua (1938–2008), daughter-in-law of Mao Zedong, photographed party celebrities, factories and army units in the 1950s, head of the China Photographers Association

== T ==
- Tang Ying Chi (born 1956), Hong Kong visual artist, creates paintings from her digital photographs
- Tian Yuan (born 1985), singer, actress, writer, photographer

== W ==
- Xiao Hui Wang (fl 1990s), photography, film and television projects
- Wong Wo Bik (active since 1980s), fine arts photographer, based in Hong Kong

== X ==
- Xiao Zhuang (born 1933), photojournalist and photo-editor.
- Xing Danwen (born 1967), contemporary artist and photographer

== Y ==
- Luo Yang (born 1984), photographer of women

== Z ==
- Zhang Jingna (born 1988), now in Singapore, professional photographer for companies including Mercedes-Benz and Canon, has also contributed to Harper's Bazaar, Elle and Flare
- O Zhang (born 1976), photographs of Chinese youth including Chinese girls adopted by Americans and Chinese art students in London
- Zhu Lan Qing (born 1991), artistic photographer, based in Taipei
