= Jidi =

Jidi may refer to:

- Jidi, Azerbaijan, a village in Gəgiran, Lankaran Rayon, Azerbaijan
- Jidi (cartoonist), Chinese cartoonist
