= Ding Yu =

Ding Yu may refer to

- Ding Yu (Ming dynasty), general who was executed by Zhu Yuanzhang
- Ding Yu (painter)
