= Luo Wei =

Luo Wei may refer to:

- Luo Wei (taekwondo)
- Luo Wei (artist)

== See also ==
- Lo Wei, Hong Kong film director
