= Yan Han =

Yan Han may refer to:

- Yan Han (artist) (1916–2011), Chinese artist and teacher
- Yan Han (figure skater) (born 1996), Chinese figure skater
