= Wang Yuelian =

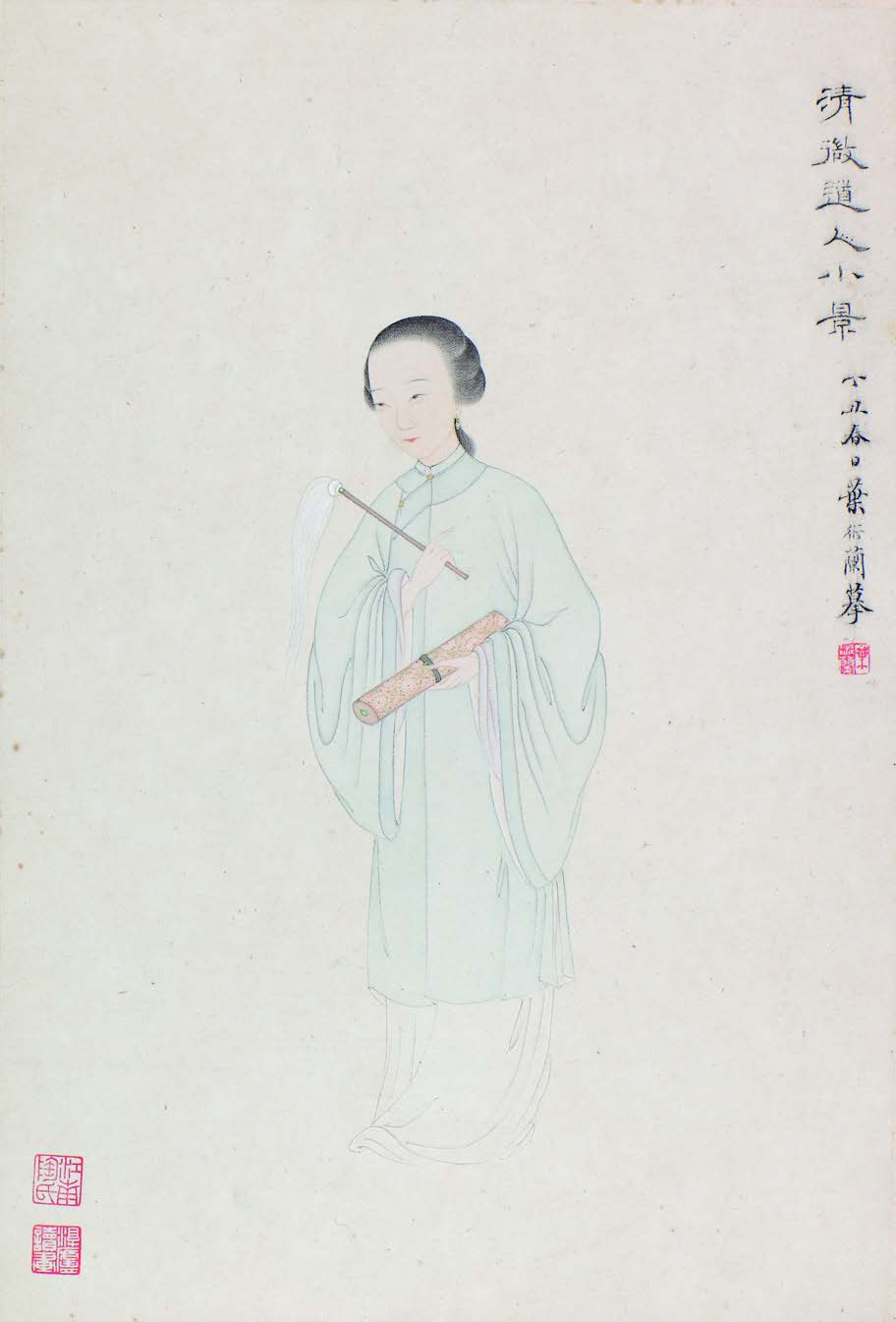
- Portrait of Wang Yuelian by Ye Yanlan (1878)
- Born: 1778
- Died: 1827 (aged 48–49)
- Occupation: Painter, nun

Wang Yuelian (1778 – 1827; Chinese:王嶽蓮), also called Jinglian (淨蓮), was a Qing Dynasty Chinese Daoist nun who was a celebrated painter, poet, and calligrapher. She was also known by the courtesy name Yun Xiang (韻香) and the art names Yujing daoren (玉井道) and Qingwei daoren (清微).

Wang Yuelian was a native of Liangxi. As a child, she entered the Cloister for Dual Cultivation of Fortune and Wisdom (Fuhui shuangxiu an 福慧雙脩庵), a Buddhist nunnery near the east gate of Liangxi. As an adult, she grew her hair and rejected Buddhism for Daoism. She adopted the art name Yujing daoren ("Daoist of the Jade Well") in honor of the celebrated Daoist and yiji Bian Yujing, one of the Eight Beauties of Qinhuai. She became acquainted with numerous important male scholars and officials, drinking and reciting poetry with them.

Her extant paintings, on fans and scrolls, depict orchids, bamboo, and rocks, with strong and spontaneous brushwork. As a calligrapher, she was skilled in the small regular script (xiǎokǎi). She also published a book of poetry, Qingfen jingshe xiaoji (清芬精舍小輯).

Wang Yuelian owned a scroll painting by Xi Gang, one of the Eight Master Painters of the West Lake, A Painting of Listening to the Rain in the Hollow Mountain (Kongshan tingyu tu 空山聽雨圖). It was considered it a masterpiece and she collected hundreds of poems inscribed by admirers of it, which she collected into an album with the painting. When the album was stolen, she commissioned Lü Pei to repaint the painting, which is now in the Wuxi Museum.

According to the Molin Jinhu by Jiang Baoling, she had been cheated in some manner by a "frivolous youngster" and committed suicide by hanging herself.
