= Lists of Chinese artists =

This is a list of artists who were born in the China or whose artworks are closely associated with that country.

== Printmakers ==
- Li Hua (1907–1994), woodcut artist and communist
- Yan Han (1916–2011), printmaker and painter; chairman of the Chinese Printmakers' Association and standing director of the Chinese Artists' Association
- Zheng Shuang (born 1936), educator and woodcut artist
- Zhu Gui (1644–1717), woodcut artist

== See also ==
- List of Chinese people
- List of Chinese women artists
