= Wei Ren (ceramic artist) =

Chinese ceramic artist

Artist Wei Ren
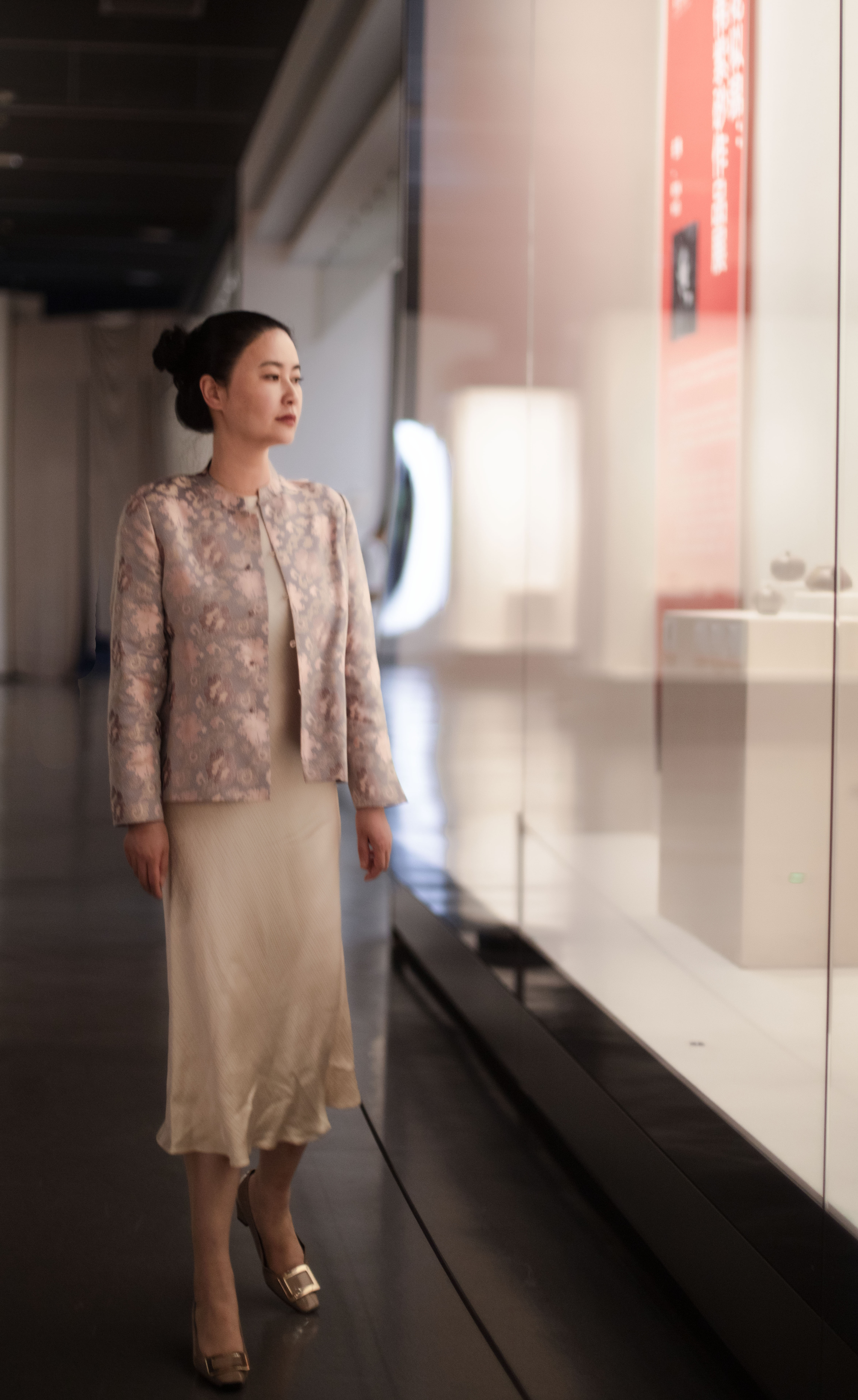
- Wei Ren at her art exhibition
- Born: Dingshu Town, Yixing
- Known for: Pottery

Seal
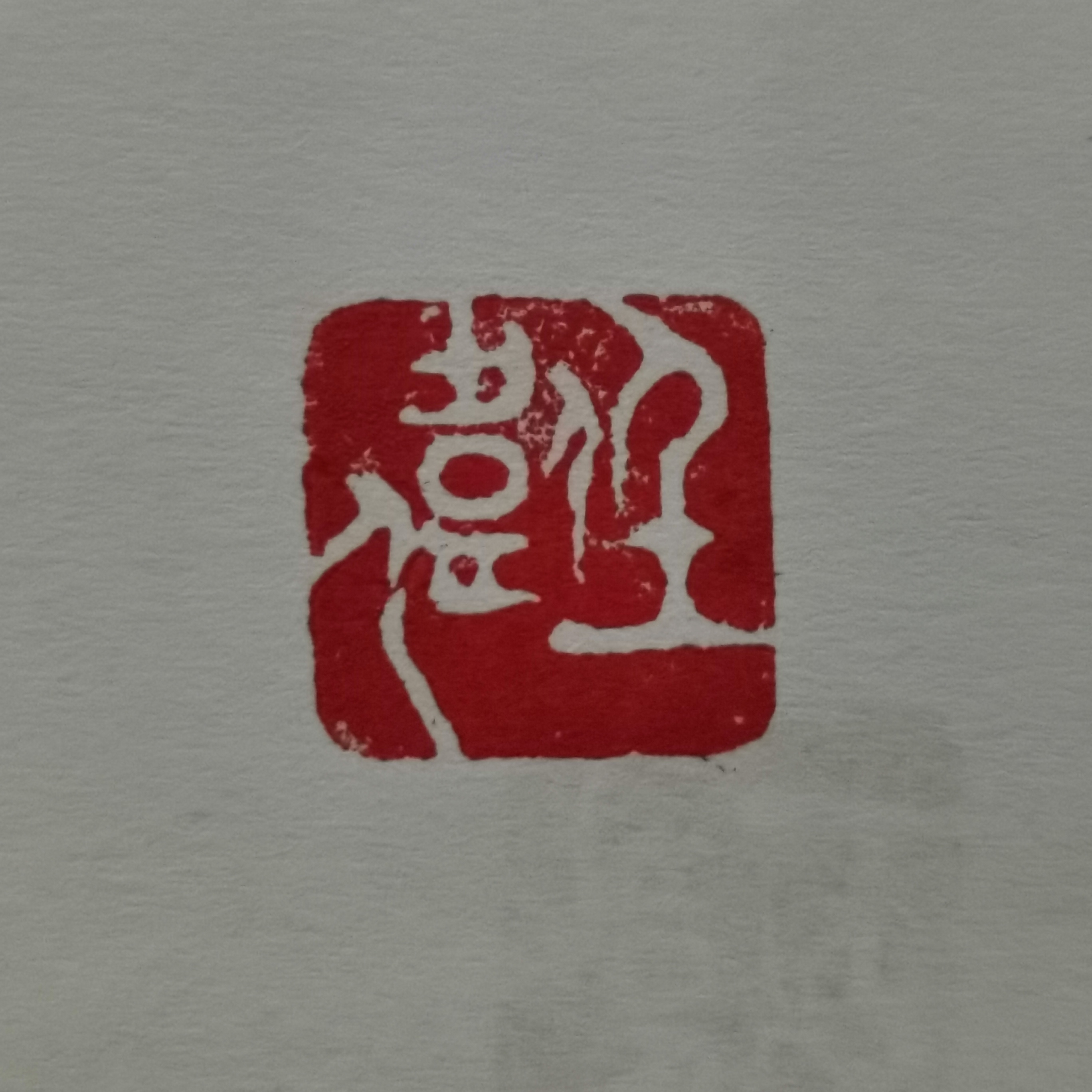

Wei Ren (simplified Chinese: 任伟;born in China in 1978）is a national zisha clay arts and crafts artist.

In 2018, Wei Ren was awarded the title of Liaoning Province pottery Art Master by the Liaoning Provincial Government of China.

Wei Ren's artworks are in the collections of the National Museum of China and WuXi Museum.

== Early life and education ==
Wei Ren was born in Yixing, a city in Jiangsu Province, China. Her family is known for its pottery crafts background. Her grandfather Degui Ren is a ceramic artist. Her father Hongxi Ren is also a pottery artist.

== Career ==
Wei's career as an artist began with her work Confucian elegance (simplified Chinese：儒风雅韵), which was collected by Wuxi Museum in 1995.

In 2018, Wei was awarded the title of Liaoning Province Ceramic Art Master by the Liaoning Provincial Government of China.

Wei released her collection "lian ni"（simplified Chinese： 恋泥） in 2020.

In 2021, Wei's work "Flower Language Pot"（simplified Chinese： 花语壶） was published in Shandong Ceramics Books. In the same year, Shandong Ceramics published an article about Wei's work "Jinwu Xianrui Pot".

Wei Ren's work "Shipiao" was collected by the National Museum of China in 2022.

In 2024, the Changzhou Museum in China held an art exhibition for Wei Ren titled "Blooming Flowers", displaying her 12 works of art.

== Awards and recognition ==
In 1995, Wei Ren's works of Confucian elegance(simplified Chinese：儒风雅韵) were collected by Wuxi Museum in China.
