= Gəgiran =

- Municipality
- Location within Azerbaijan
- Coordinates: 38°51′00″N 48°35′17″E
- Country: Azerbaijan
- Rayon: Lankaran

Population
  - Total: 1,925
- Time zone: UTC+4 (AZT)
  - Summer (DST): UTC+5 (AZT)

Gəgiran (also, Gegeran & Gegiran) is a village and municipality in the Lankaran Rayon of Azerbaijan. It has a population of 1,925. The municipality consists of the villages of Gəgiran, Diryan and Jidi.
