= Li Xinmo =

Chinese feminist artist, art critic and teacher

- Born: April 21, 1976 (age 50); Yilan County, Heilongjiang
- Occupation: Artist

Li Xinmo (Chinese: 李心沫; born April 21, 1976 in Yilan County, Heilongjiang) is a Chinese feminist artist, art critic, and teacher. She graduated from the Department of Chinese Painting, and received her master's degree from Tianjin Academy of Fine Arts in 2008 and now resides in Beijing. She is a member of the German IO culture institution, vice president of Chinese and Germany culture communication organization. Li is mainly devoted to feminist theory and contemporary art criticism research. Her creation involves a series of issues such as gender, ethnicity, environment, and national politics. Her artworks are based on a variety of media, especially performance, photography and painting. Her works have been exhibited in major art galleries such as the Louvre in France, the National Museums of World Culture in Gothenburg, Sweden, and the Bonn Women's Museum in Germany. She also participated in Toronto Photo Biennial and Prague Art Biennial. Many museums such as the Taida Museum and the Museum of Far Eastern Antiquities in Sweden have some of her works.

== Early life ==
Li was born in 1976 in a traditional Chinese patriarchal family, and grew up in Heilongjiang Province in northern China. Xinmo once told that she grew up in a violent family in an interview. What's more, she studied calligraphy from an early age.

== Education and early career ==
Li graduated from Art Education Department of Harbin Normal University in 1997 and taught at a private university for half a year. From 2005 to 2008, she was a graduate student of the Chinese Painting Department of the Tianjin Academy of Fine Arts and a lecturer at the School of Modern Art of Tianjin Academy Fine Arts. It was in university that she experienced feminist artwork for the first time, which led to her interest in feminist theory, queer theory, and eco-feminism. In an interview, she listed female artists Louise Bourgeois, Marlene Dumas, Kiki Smith, and Marina Abramović as inspirations. Currently living in Beijing, she teaches at the School of Modern Art at Beijing Geely University.

== Exhibitions ==
- "Excluded", Xinmo Li, Solo Exhibition, Kaiser & Cream Art District, Wiesbaden, Germany, March 2015.
- “In Another Place, And Here”, Exhibition, Art Gallery of Greater Victoria, Canada, 2015.
- “Guangzhou Live 5”, International action art event, Guangzhou Xiaozhou, China, 2014.
- “Bald Girls - Pink Solution”, Exhibition, Lia Contemporary Art, Colombia, 2014.
- “Switch”, Contemporary Art Exhibition, Xian Contemporary Museum, Xian, China, 2014.
- “Through The Body”, A primary exhibition of Contact Photography Festival, University of Toronto Art Centre, Toronto, Canada, 2014.
- “Single Mother”, Exhibition, Frauenmuseum, Bonn, Germany, January 2014.
- “Different Body”, Exhibition, Haian 523, Jiangsu Province, China, 2013.
- “Bald Girls - A door”, Zajialab, Beijing, China, 2013.
- “Secret Love”, Exhibition, National Museums of World Cultur, Gothenburg, Sweden, 2013.
- “Bald Girls Exhibition of Xiaolu Lixinmo and Lanjing”, Iberia Center for Contemporary Art, Beijing, China, 2012.
- “100 Anniversary Of Chinese Ink-Painting”, Exhibition, Louvre, France, 2012.
- “UN Forbidden City”, Macro, Rome, Italy, 2012.
- “Li Xinmo + Qingshuihuimei”, Performance Art Exhibition, Dingshun Contemporary Art Space, Beijing, China, 2011.
- “Oaths of Love”, Photography Exhibition, Wenjin International Gallery, Beijing, China, 2011.
- “Solo Exhibition” by Li Xinmo, Tense Space, Beijing, China, 2011.
- “An Archive of Contemporary Video Art in 2010”, Songzhuang Art Center, Beijing, China, 2010.
- “Collaboration - Contemporary Works of Video and Performance Art Exhibition”, Beijing, China, 2009.
- “Xi’an International Contemporary Art Fair Participant”, Xi’an Art Museum, Xi’an, China, 2009.
- “Changing Directions and Interconnections”, Contemporary Ink Painting Exhibition, Huantie Time Art Museum, Beijing, China, 2009.
- “Great Works of Chinese Oil Painting Exhibition”, China Central Place, Beijing, China, 2009.
- “21st Century Invitational Ink- Painting Exhibition”, Art Museum of China, Beijing, China, 2008.
- “Participant in an Italian Video Art Performance”, Yuanfen Gallery, Beijing, China, 2008.
- “Beijing Dadao Live Arts Festival”, Yu Gallery, Beijing, China, 2008.
- “Exhibition of International Contemporary Art”, Beijing Sunshine Art Gallery, Beijing, China, 2008.
- “Major Exhibition of Young Artists”, Shanghai Duolun Museum of Modern Art, Shanghai, China, 2008.

== Artwork ==
"The Death of the Xinkai River" is one of Li Xinmo's earliest performance pieces, performed in June 2008. At that time, Li lived at the Xinkai River, which is severely polluted. In an interview, Li explains her personal connection to the river as well as the rape and murder of a woman that led Li to create her piece:

In the summer, the water is covered with cyano algae that spread a pungent smell. Each time I walked along the river I became incredibly sad. Those green hues glared and were turbid at the same time: life and death all in one. One day a girl’s body was recovered from the river. Later it was confirmed that she had been raped and murdered. an artwork. It was my performance piece The Death of the Xinkai River. I cannot swim, I am afraid of it even. Nevertheless, I went into this dead river. The performance resembled a theater amidst nature. . . . This river was a metaphor for the death of nature. I combined female death and the death of nature to an integral whole. It was a double metaphor that was in keeping with my own situation at that time as well as the realities that I observed.

In another interview, Li describes this work from an eco-feminist lens:

This work combines water pollution with the fate of women. In a patriarchal culture, women and nature are simultaneously excluded from men and human society as the Other. Thirty years of modernization in China have led to a dramatic deterioration of the ecological environment, with water pollution being a particularly serious problem, while the situation of women has not changed substantially, and sexual violence against women is a common occurrence. I went into the polluted river covered with cyanobacteria and combined the death of women with the death of the river, a tribute to a river and a representation of the fate of women.

She also mentions that the piece was a "reinterpretation and response" to the character Ophelia in Shakespeare's Hamlet.

"A Farewell Ritual" was a follow-up work to "The Death of the Xinkai River" in which Li immersed herself in a glass tank filled with contaminated water.

"Memory of Vagina" is one piece of art that targets the patriarchy society by using a gun to describe the patriarchy and visualize the damage to women from the community. This work is an example of how the invisible violence from the community has been materialized in the modern art.

"I am 5 Years old" this performance piece was based on the story of a five-year-old girl who was sexually assaulted by her father. Li put a razor blade into her mouth, and began to tell the story of the little girl. Li was unable to speak clearly with the blade in her mouth, with every word the blade made a cut. This performance was painful. Which represents how painful it was for the young girl to talk about the abuse and how talking about it brought her more suffering.

In her piece "Free," Li stands in front of an audience and have them put clips all over her body. She then commands them to "pull," the audience pulls and all the clips release from her body. Li experience great pain, but her body is released.

== Barriers ==
Even though Li Xinmo's artwork has been accepted by many Western countries, the impact of her idea and art has not been promoted to the public domestically. The conflicts between traditional Chinese culture and performance art have natively affected many feminist arts in China. Most feminists who use modern art to propose their idea to protect the rights for women are not accepted by the public. In an interview, Li explains her experiences as a self-proclaimed feminist artist in China:

After I published a series of works that positioned themselves as feminist, published articles, and publicly committed myself to feminism, the art world's response was strong, at the same time I was confronted with countless attacks and met with resistance. I discovered more and more that I was fighting a lonely battle. China is an eminently masculinist society, critics, curators, and artists are all men. They prefer well-behaved and compliant female artists and hate feminism. To insist on feminist positions means to isolate oneself, to be marginalized and even demonized. . . . In the last years controls became tighter and the spaces smaller and smaller, it is difficult to raise the voice once again.
