= Canal Cheong Jagerroos =

Chinese contemporary artist (born 1968)

- 張彤茹
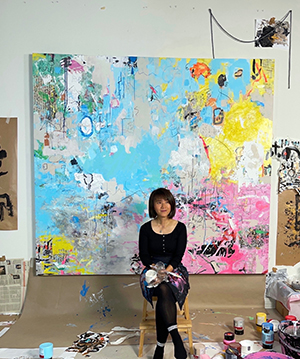
- Cheong Jagerroos at her home in Helsinki
- Born: 1968 (age 57–58)
- Education: Guangzhou Academy of Fine Arts
- Occupation: Contemporary artist
- Known for: Multi-layered rice-paper abstract paintings
- Website: canalcheongjagerroos.com

Canal Cheong Jagerroos (Chinese: 張彤茹; born 1968) is a Chinese contemporary artist. Brought up in an artistic family in Macau, Cheong Jagerroos works primarily in abstract painting and installations. Her works have been exhibited worldwide since the 1980s. While Cheong Jagerroos is best known for her more traditional multi-layered rice-paper abstract paintings, her later works are based on conceptual art. Her art is infused with ancient metaphoric symbols, signs, and contemporary expressions.

Her recent large-scale paintings solo exhibitions 'Blue and Red Art project' and 'Floating Island' with (calligraphy) textile were displayed at Salo Art Museum, Jyväskylä Art Museum, Joensuuu Art Museum, Korundi Rovaniemi Art Museum and Xian Art Museum from 2018 to May 2020. She currently splits her time living and working between Helsinki, Shanghai, Nice, Berlin and Tokyo.

== Personal life ==
Canal Cheong Jagerroos was born in an artistic family and grew up in Macau. Her father was an artist, and her mother an opera singer. Ever since she was a little girl she wanted to be an artist. She was taught the Chinese traditional painting at an early age, particularly by her father. Cheong Jagerroos' father played an important role in her artistic education infusing in her the strong basis of traditional Chinese art and the tradition shapes. She married Finnish-Swedish Johan Jägerroos in 1991, whom she met in 1987 when studying at Guangzhou Academy of Fine Arts in China and Jägerroos was studying Chinese at Sun Yat-sen University. Together they have two children, their son was born in France and their daughter in Switzerland. During the past 30 years, Cheong Jagerroos has lived and worked in numerous countries in Asia, Europe as well as in Africa. The experiences she has acquired from living in the culturally diverse cities of Hong Kong, Shanghai, Strasbourg, Zürich, Trieste, Dakar, and Helsinki has influenced her professional work.

== Education ==
Cheong Jagerroos studied courses in fine art at the Guangzhou Academy of Fine Arts. She further studied courses in painting, Chinese painting, oil painting, contemporary art, applying art and experimental art, among other courses. She finished these courses in 1989 and returned to Macau, only to soon resume her artistic studies in Hong Kong, studying art and graphic design at the Open University of Hong Kong for one year.

== Artistic style ==
Cheong Jagerroos incorporates multi-layered paintings, drawings, signs, symbols, mix-media and calligraphy to depict the cumulative effects of urban changes with a contemporary expression. She combines Chinese traditional techniques and with giant abstract compositions. Cheong Jagerroos has been a citizen of western and eastern cities, which informs her artistic creations. Westerners easily spot the abundance of Chinese elements, such as calligraphy, in her work, however, the rice-papers and collage she also uses are more difficult to notice. "Her unique constructive, deconstructive, and reconstructive technique is in fact extremely complicated and sophisticated" commented Crystal Xu, Chief Curator and Manager at the Beijing Being 3 Gallery.

Under the influence of two philosophers, Bada Shanren (1626-1705) and Laozi (530 BC), she finds inspiration upon observing the laws and development of nature, the contemporary social issues as well as in being authentic to herself and to her own personal feelings.

== Public exhibitions ==
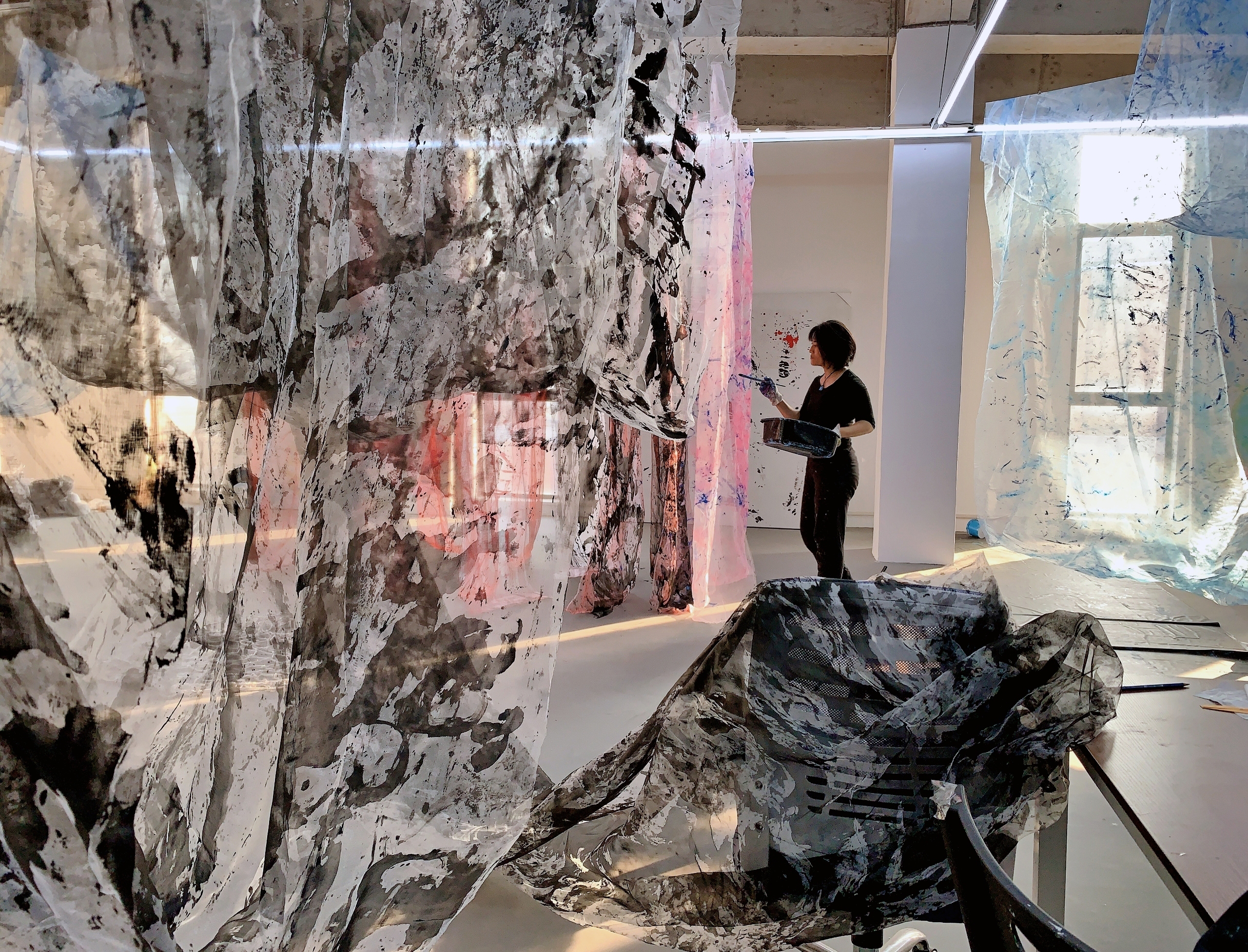
Canal Cheong Jagerroos at her studio in Shanghai.

Country	City	Year	Exhibition title	Gallery
China	Xian	2017	"Beholders - B&RAP"	Xian Art Museum
China	Beijing	2018	"Awaking"	Being 3 Gallery
China	Macao	2014	"Pure Affection I" (純 觸覚)	Rui Cunha Foundation
China	Hong Kong	2010	"Essence of A Girl"	Gallery Karin Weber
Finland	Helsinki	2008	"Realm of Solitude"	Galleria Bulevardi 7
Finland	Helsinki	2010	"Carpe Diem"	Galleria Uusitalo
Finland	Helsinki	2014	"Infinity – Boundless"	Galleria A_C Gallery
Finland	Tampere	2017	"Inverse Nature Stage II - B&RAP"	Finlayson Art Area
Finland	Salo	2018	"Floating Island – Tower"	Salo Art Museum Roundhouse
Finland	Joensuu	2019	"Undefined Exclusion"	Joensuu Art Museum
Finland	Söderkulla	2019	"Essence of Growth"	Gumbostrand Konst & Form
Finland	Jyväskylä	2019	"Floating Island – Utopia"	Jyväskylä Art Museum
Finland	Punkaharju	2020	"Floating Island – Drifting", "Linear Hope"	Saimaan Taideluola Art Cave
Finland	Rovaniemi	2020	"Floating Island-Beyond Arctic", "Extract - B&RAP"	Korundi Rovaniemi Art Museum
France	Strasbourg	1995, 1999	"Lover", "Autumn Color"	Gallery Sum Qui Sum
France	Cannes	2013	"Royaume des Saisons"	Galerie Geneviève Marty
Italy	Trieste	2002	"The Sound of Nature"	Galleria Rettori Tribbio
Italy	Venice	2013	"Time. Space. Existence."	55th Venice Biennale
Japan	Chiba	2016	"Three Persons Exhibition" (縁. 市川市館)	Yoshizawa Garden Gallery
Portugal	Estoril	2013	"Pure Affection II"	Galeria de Arte do Casino Estoril
Senegal	Dakar	2004	"An African Girl"	Dak'art Biennale
Senegal	Dakar	2004	"Morning Task"	DWGS Art
Sweden	Göteborg	2008	"A Silver Day"	Galeria Viktoria
Sweden	Stockholm	2011	"Summerdream"	Galleri Utställningssalongen
Sweden	Göteborg	2012	"Selective Reality"	Galeria Viktoria
Switzerland	Zurich	1998, 2000, 2001	"Home", "Seeking for Kingdom", "Evening Party"	Gallery Arrigo
Switzerland	Basel	2017	"Reality of Transcendence - B&RAP"	Basel Art Centre
UK	London	2013	"Seeking for Inner-Self"	Gallery NTG
USA	Miami	2016	"Eternal Love"	Tranter Gallery
USA	Miami	2020	"Floating Island- Realm of Wonder"	Tranter Gallery
