= Niu Weiyu =

Chinese photojournalist (1927–2020)

Niu Weiyu (Chinese: 牛畏予; January 1927 – 3 June 2020) was a Chinese photojournalist whose career started in the 1940s with coverage of the Chinese Communist Party's wartime experiences and continued after 1949. She is praised for her photographs of ordinary workers and ethnic groups, and as one of the few women in photography, she specialized in female images.

Niu was a member of the Chinese Communist Party and the Chinese Photographers Association. Her husband, Gao Fan (1922-2004) was also a wartime and post-1949 photographer.

== Life and career ==
Niu Weiyu was born in Tanghe, Henan in January 1927. In 1945, Niu entered Counter-Japanese Military and Political University, and in 1947 became an officer in the Political Department of the Liberated Area. She became a photographer attached to the Eighth Route Army, then turned to news photography for North China Pictorial and other journals.

After 1949, she became head of the Xinhua News Agency department of photography until her retirement in 1982. In 1975, as the Cultural Revolution was coming to an end, she went to Tibet, traveling by jeep from Chengdu.

Niu died on 3 June 2020, at the age of 93.
