= Jidi, Azerbaijan =

Human settlement in Azerbaijan

Coordinates: 38°52′N 48°34′E

Jidi is a village in the municipality of Gəgiran in the Lankaran Rayon of Azerbaijan.

== See also ==
- Judeo-Persian
