= Shen Yuan =

Chinese-French artist

Shen Yuan (Chinese: 沈远; born 1959 in Xianyou, Fujian), is a Chinese-born French artist. She graduated from China Academy of Art in 1982, and then started to practice in the Xiamen Dada group, an artists group that is known for exploring radical avant-garde art in Southern China. She moved to Paris, France with her husband Huang Yong Ping after the 1989 Tiananmen Square protests.

As a contemporary artist, Shen Yuan's art often reflects on Chinese cultural and political realities. She has strong messages of feminism and gender roles in her artworks. Topics include issues such as labor (child labor, women workers), slums, and social conflicts. Her artistic process often makes use of on-the-spot investigations and local creative methods to work together with local children or people to complete the work.

She has been featured in many exhibitions. Her and her husband's works were featured in Solomon R. Guggenheim Museum's group exhibition Art and China after 1989: Theater of the World, and in exhibition Hong Kong Foot at Tang Contemporary Art in Hong Kong.

== Early life ==
Shen Yuan was born to a family of artists. She took up painting under encouragement from her father. In the new art movement known as '85, the artists of Xiamen Dada engaged in contemporary art within the context of a tense political climate. In 1990, Shen Yuan and her husband Huang Yong Ping left China and resettled in Paris. In this city vibrant with artistic activity, they encountered a newly found creative freedom. Nonetheless, the displacement presented a new host of challenges including cultural confrontation, language barriers, and the pressures of life in a new environment.

== Art works ==
Having moved to Paris, Shen Yuan's works often discuss the topics of immigration experience, identity, travel and life. The identity of immigrants prompted her to enter a new phase of creativity. When she first arrived in Paris, she lived in an old abandoned hospital. Because of the language barrier, she could not express her thoughts or defend herself. This experience of isolation was encapsulated in the sole work of the exhibition Perdre sa salive (1994), where nine tongues made of ice were mounted on the walls. After the ice melt, the knives buried inside appeared—the soft tongue became a dangerous weapon, just as language could cause harm.

The symbol of the tongue in Shen Yuan's work has multiple layers of meanings. Conceptually, it is dualistic—both material as part of the body, and spiritual as an instrument to express the mind. “In my creation, the tongue is more representative of the latter, namely language and tools. I like ice as a material because it has a fragile and easily melting side, but when you hold it in your hand, it is biting.” Visually, it is in the process of constant change and instability.

== Personal life ==
Shen Yuan was married to the renowned contemporary artist, Huang Yong Ping. They carried out a number of collaborative projects. "We both have a strong personality, but we understand and support each other." When asked about her husband in an interview, Shen Yuan said, “When we first came to Paris, we decided not to have children. But then some years later, I felt the urge of wanting a kid." They have a daughter, born in 1995.

== Exhibitions ==
Selected Solo Exhibitions

| Year | Title of Exhibition |
|---|---|
| 2018 | "HON: Niki de Saint Phalle & Shen Yuan", Power Station of Art, Shanghai, China |
| 2017 | “Without Wall”, Tang Contemporary Art, Beijing, China |
| 2015 | “Étoiles du jour”, Galerie Kamel Mennour, Paris, France |
| 2013 | “FIAC”, Hors-les-murs, Tuileries, Paris, France |
| 2012 | “Sky Ladder”, Tang Contemporary Art, Beijing, China |
| 2011 | “Crâne de la Terre”, Parc Monceau et Musée Cernuschi, Paris, France |
| 2010 | “Garofalo” (with Huang Yongping), Edicola Notte, Rome, Italy |
| | “Garofalo” (with Huang Yongping), Edicola Notte, Rome, Italy |
| 2009 | “Shen Yuan: Hurried words”, UCCA Middle Hall, Beijing, China |
| 2008 | “Le Degré Zéro de l’espace”, Galerie Kamel Mennour, Paris, France |
| 2007 | “Shen Yuan”, Centre A, Vancouver, Canada |
| 2005 | Galerie Beaumontpublic, Luxembourg |
| 2003 | “Shen Yuan”, Kunstverein Nürtingen, Germany |
| | “Beauty Room 5”, Beauty Room Gallery, Paris, France |
| 2001 | “Shen Yuan”, Bluecoat, Liverpool, UK |
| | “Shen Yuan”, Arnolfini, Bristol, UK |
| | Un Matin du Monde", Chisenhale Gallery, London, UK |
| | “Shen Yuan”, French Institute, London, UK |
| 2000 | “Sous la terre, il y a le ciel”, Kunsthalle Bern, Switzerland |
| 1999 | “Diverged Tongue”, Project Gallery at CCA Kitakyushu, Japan |
| 1994 | “Perdre sa salive”, organized by Vices & Vertus, Paris, France |
