= Yuhua Shouzhi Wang =

American painter

Yuhua Shouzhi Wang (born 1966), is a contemporary Chinese American artist. In 2000, she worked as a professor in the College of Liberal Arts at Auburn University. She is the Lifetime Honorary Chairwoman of the International Art Museum of America where her work is on permanent exhibit. Dr. Yuhua Shouzhi Wang was recognized as an international first-class artist by New York Academy of Art.

== Awards, honors, and achievements ==
In 2013, President George Christophides of the World Federation of UNESCO Clubs, Centers, and Associations (WFUCA) conferred the title "2013 WFUCA" to Dr. Wang's artworks.

In 2019, Dr. Wang was recognized as an international first-class artist by New York Academy of Art in the United States.

On March 18, 2019, Dr. Wang's artwork "Pomegranates in Bamboo Basket" of size 27" x 18" commanded $1.27 million in Gianguan Auctions.

== Painting style ==
Dr. Wang's painting style combines elements from Eastern and Western art. Professor Stephen Farthing, a member of the Royal Academy of Arts in the U.K. has remarked that "Dr. Wang’s paintings may draw heavily on the traditions of Eastern art, but they present themselves as extraordinarily Western ideas and images", and that Dr. Wang's paintings "reach across cultures to celebrate the space that exists intellectually and emotionally between representation and abstraction, between a fact and an idea."

== Solo exhibitions ==
- 2019, "Seeing Two Worlds in One Flower", Musée des Arts Décoratifs, Paris
- 2019, Shanghai Exhibition Center, Shanghai, China
- 2019, Ratchadamnoen Contemporary Art Center, Department of Culture of Thailand, Bangkok, Thailand
- 2018, Dapeng Art Institute, Shenzhen, China
- 2008, Gold Room at the United States Capitol

== Theme exhibitions ==
- 2021, Claude Monet and Yuhua Shouzhi Wang: An Exhibition of Water Lily Paintings in Dialogue, organized by the Art Who's Who Museum of Paintings in Dialogue, Los Angeles, California, the United States

== Bibliography ==
- World’s Highest-Level Color Paintings and Ink-Wash Paintings
- Paintings of Yuhua Shouzhi Wang
- Yuhua Shouzhi Wang Flower and Bird Paintings
