= Jiny Lan =

German visual artist

- 蓝镜
- Born: May 3, 1970 (age 56); Liaoning Province, China
- Education: Bohai University; China Academy of Art; Dortmund University
- Style: Visual artist

Jiny Lan (Chinese: 蓝镜; pinyin: Lan Jing; born 3 May 1970) is a German-based Chinese visual artist. Before emigrating to Germany in 1995, she graduated from the China Academy of Fine Arts (中国美术学院), in Hangzhou. Lan is one of the founding members of the “Bald Girls”, the first feminist art collective founded in China, which seeks to promote Chinese avant-garde feminist art internationally while similarly introducing internationally influential feminist artists to China. Her work primarily consists of paintings, performances, installations, multi-media forms, and films. In 2025, Düsseldorf City Council approved the establishment of an art foundation named after her.

== Life ==
Lan was born and raised in Xiuyan, Liaoning Province, China. At a young age she became interested in the fine arts, and from 1976 to 1986 she took painting classes at the cultural arts centre in Xiuyan, led by Liu Renjie. In 1984, Liu Renjie moved to teaching at the Lu Xun Academy of the Arts in Shenyang, however he and Lan have remained in close contact throughout her artistic career. From 29 August to 24 September 2006, Lan took part in the joint exhibition From 'Polar Region' to 'Tie Xi Qu – Exhibition of Contemporary Art in Northeast China (1985–2006) at the Guangdong Museum of Art in Guangzhou, China alongside Liu Renjie and other artists.

From 1988 to 1991, after completing her secondary school education, Lan studied economics at Bohai University in Jinzhou, Liaoning Province. Following her graduating in 1991, Lan then attended the China Academy of Fine Arts in Hangzhou, Zheijiang Province (1991–1984). Because the pursuit of a second college degree is not state-funded in China, unlike the first, Lan earned a living throughout her studies by producing architectural, poster, and advertising paintings and designs. From 1994 till 1995, she also worked for the People's Daily in Beijing as an arts journalist.

In 1995, Lan emigrated to Germany. During the emigration process, the customs and passport authorities incorrectly entered her name as “Jiny” instead of her given name “Jing” onto her documents. From that point on, “Jiny” became her legal first name.

From 1997 to 2002, Lan was enrolled at Dortmund University, where she pursued a teaching degree in the combined subjects of art and English. In 1999 she obtained German citizenship. During this time until 2005, she also traveled many times to London, Paris, New York, and Italy to become better acquainted with Western Culture and art. While traveling, Lan earned her keep by painting portraits.

Lan worked as a project coordinator for the Museum Schloss Moyland Foundation from 2006 to 2009. In 2013, she became a co-curator of the Joseph Beuys exhibition in China, titled Social Sculpture: Beuys in China (9 July – 15 November) at the CAFA Museum (The Central Academy of Fine Arts Museum) in Beijing. Because of this experience, influences from Joseph Beuys and the Fluxus Movement can be found within Lan’s artistic style.

Together with the Chinese artists Xiao Lu and Li Xinmo, Lan founded the Chinese feminist artist group “Bald Girls” in 2012. Just before their first exhibition in Beijing (held at the Iberia Center for Contemporary Art) opened to the public, her piece Collective Efforts – Red Sun was ordered to be removed. In Collective Efforts – Red Sun, Lan had presented herself as Jiang Qing, Mao Zedong's widow, who, after Mao’s death in 1976, was sentenced to life imprisonment for “counter-revolutionary crimes” during the Cultural Revolution, and later committed suicide in prison in 1991. Because of this act of censorship, Lan and her work attracted the attention of international media such as The New York Times.

Jiny Lan currently lives with her family in Bochum, a city in the German federal state of North Rhine-Westphalia. She works both at home in Bochum, and in her studio in Düsseldorf, and commutes regularly between China and Germany.

== Work ==
Lan’s avant-garde painting style, Um-Malungsmanöver or the “repainting process”, has become one of her signature hallmarks.

In 2013, Lan once more pursued showcasing the theme of her previous work Collective Efforts – Red Sun (which had fallen victim to censorship in China back in 2012), in her own individual exhibition, One-Person-Choir, at the museum NRW-Forum Düsseldorf. In both the downtown area of Düsseldorf and along the autobahn, Lan put up 56 T-18 road signs and 108 DIN A0 posters. Her motif was in essence the same as the one that had been forbidden in China, however it did not arouse any effect or strong reaction in Düsseldorf.

A short time later, Lan painted a male genital organ onto her own nude portrait for a benefit auction in support of the women’s organization, Terre des Femmes, at the Berlinische Galerie. This previously unannounced addition to her painting upset the auctioneer, who had come from Christie’s, a highly traditional London-based auction house. TV anchorman and publicist Roger Willemsen offered Lan the opportunity to explain her motivation behind this controversial addition to her painting; Lan answered that it was meant to oppose the global unconscious perception of women being seen as objects. The painting did not sell at the auction—Lan later donated the piece to the Berlin office of Terre des Femmes.

For the opening of the Single Moms joint exhibition at the Bonn Women’s Museum in 2014, Lan staged a performance, during which she, before an audience, painted over a portrait of the Chinese philosopher Confucius, such that the image was transformed from having male to female genitalia. She then had the image “give birth” to his “81 generations of successors” using baby dolls.

In the summer of 2017, Lan performed “Augenzeugen für Fälschung gesucht” (“Wanted: Eye-witnesses to a Forgery”) at her individual exhibition at the Museum Kunstforum Wien. Once more in front of an audience, she painted the head of the then-candidate for Federal Chancellor of Austria, Sebastian Kurz, onto a nude painting of her husband. The performance received wide-spread media coverage.

In 2019 Jiny Lan painted the series “Meisterwerke” (“Masterpieces”), in which she portrayed eight of the most important German visual artists of the post-war period, Joseph Beuys, Sigmar Polke, AR Penck, Jörg Immendorff, Gerhard Richter, Markus Lüpertz, Georg Baselitz, and Anselm Kiefer, in her own style—specifically the series was intentionally painted from her own, ironically “broken” feminist perspective. However, the series was also intended to be an homage to the artists selected, wherein it showcased the contributions the German artists had made to both the international art scene as well as its history through their individual work. The “Masterpieces” are not only portraits in the classical sense, but works of observation and analysis of German culture, as seen and experienced by Lan. The series was first shown in the “Parallel” exhibition in the Ludwiggalerie Schloss Oberhausen Museum in September 2019, then simultaneously in the “Genealogies” exhibition in the Biblioteca Nazionale Marciana in Venice and the 58th Biennale. It received both national and international attention. In Germany, Jiny Lan is known for her artist portraits of chancellors. As part of another art project, the Chinese-German artist's artwork called ‘Artainer’ - a mobile art container - is travelling the world. The project combines space exploration, sustainability, mobility and underground heritage in a new artistic format. Accordingly, a helium-filled balloon with artworks on board was launched into the stratosphere. Jiny Lan explained her idea behind it as follows: ‘To make us realise how we treat each other, how we treat nature and how we should treat the earth.’

== Publications ==
- Bald Girls, Exhibition of Xiaolu, Li Xinmo and Lan Jiny, Hrsg. Juan Xu, Iberia Center for Contemporary Art, Peking 2012, ISBN 978-986-84799-4-4.
- Jiny Lan, The World is Sometimes Flat, Sometimes Round, Hrsg. schultz contemporary, Berlin 2018, ISBN 978-3-946879-15-2.

== Links ==
- Jiny Lan Homepage
- Jiny Lan bei Galerie Schultz
- Jiny Lan bei Galerie "kunst-raum"
