= Li Pingxiang =

Chinese female singer, painter and poet

Li Pingxiang (李苹香), whose original name was Huang Zhen (黄箴), was also known as Huang Biyi (黄碧漪) and Xie Wenyi (谢文漪). Her courtesy name was Huanyin (鬟因) and she called herself Yuanhu Nushi (鸳湖女史). She was a Gējì, painter and poet in the late Qing Dynasty and early Republic of China.

== Biography ==
Li Pingxiang (李苹香)'s original name was Huang Zhen, also known as Huang Biyi. She was born into a wealthy family, so she was educated. She was born in Jiaxing, Zhejiang in 1880. In 1897, when Huang Zhen was eighteen years old, his father was traveling far away from home. Huang Zhen's mother took Huang Zhen and Huang Zhen's younger brother to Shanghai to watch foreigners horse racing, and also to look for a husband for Huang Zhen. Because of their playfulness, the three of them accidentally Spent all the money. They had no money to pay the hotel rent, so a man named Pan(潘) helped them. But this man named Pan deceived Huang Zhen's family. After Huang Zhen married this man, he discovered that this man had married another woman. In 1901, Huang Zhen was sold to a brothel in Shanghai by a man surnamed Pan. She changed her name to Li Pingxiang and entered the low-level Mo'er (么二) brothel. Later, she was promoted to the Changsan (长三) brothel because of her talent. Because Li Pingxiang has outstanding talents and is good at poetry and painting, she is only a geji (歌妓) and does not engage in prostitution. She was good at writing poems and sentences, and she was soon known as a "poetry courtesan(诗妓)" by the literati. She became a famous courtesan in Shanghai and her reputation grew day by day. Li Pingxiang is a famous talented woman who writes good poetry. She has great market and influence in the literary circle. Li Pingxiang's room is called "Tianyun Pavilion (天韵阁)", and several of her collections of poems and essays were published under the name of her room. Many years later, Wu Zhiying (吴芝瑛), a talented girl from a scholarly family, learned about Li Pingxiang's life experience, experiences and talents, and determined to help her out of the sea of suffering. Wu Zhiying used her own money to help Li Pingxiang leave her career and regarded her as a friend. Li Pingxiang changed her name to Xie Wenyi and established a Xie Wenyi calligraphy and painting studio to make a living selling calligraphy and paintings.

== Personal poetry ==
"Eight Poems to Mourn My Mother (哭母诗八首)", "Seven-Character Quatrain (七绝)", "Poems of Tianyun Pavilion (天韵阁诗集)", "Tianyun Pavilion Ruled Papers (天韵阁尺牍选)", etc.
