= Ying Miao =

Chinese contemporary artist

MIAO, Ying 苗颖
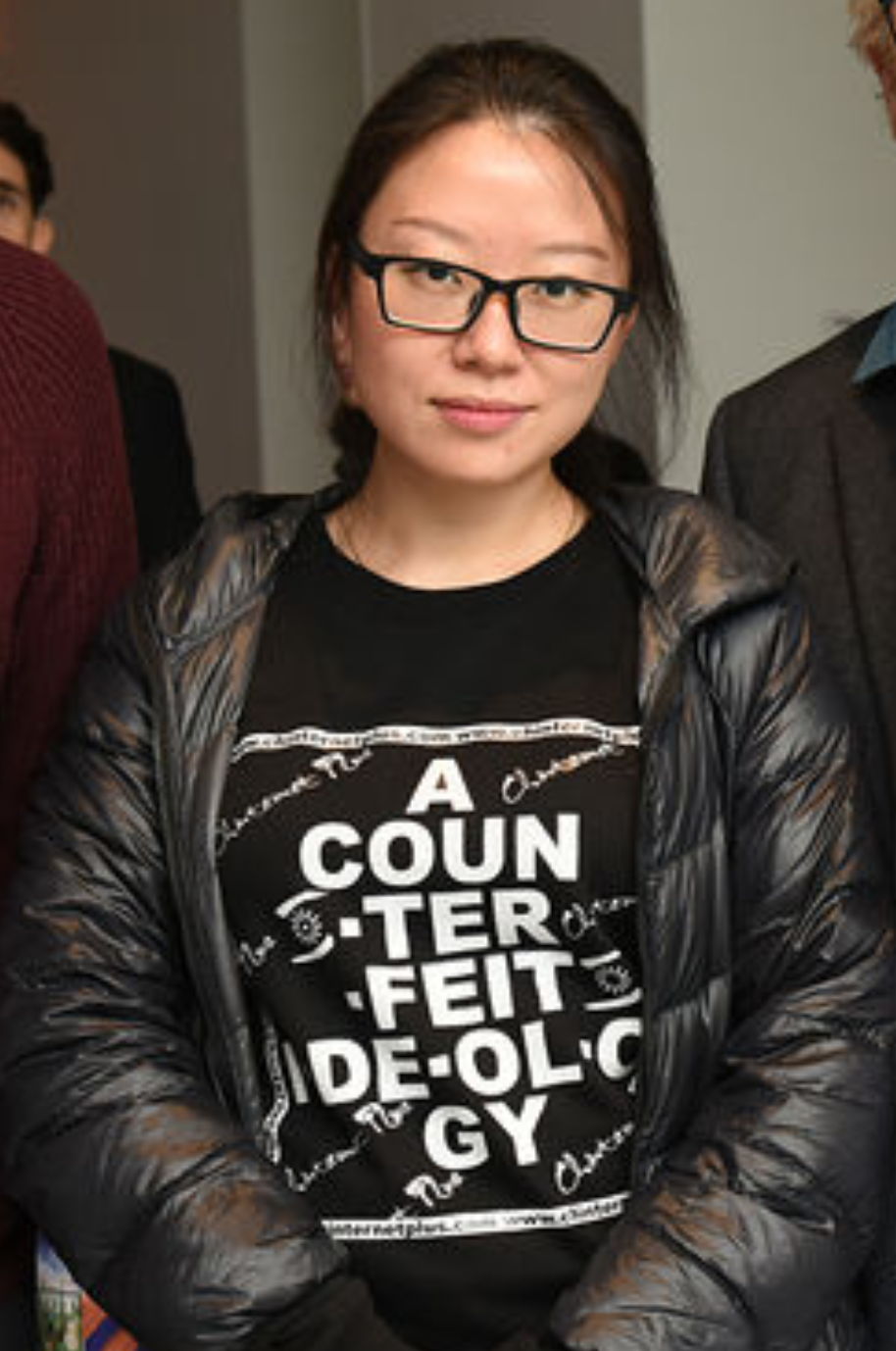
- Miao Ying in 2017
- Born: Shanghai
- Education: China Academy of Art, BA; Alfred University, MFA
- Known for: AI programing art works, paintings, installations
- Notable work: Chinternet Plus, Hardcore Digital Detox, Pilgrimage into Walden XII, Blind Spot
- Awards: Porsche Young Chinese Artist
- Website: miaoyingstudio.com

Miao Ying (Chinese: 苗颖; pinyin: Miáo Yǐng; born 1985) is a contemporary artist and writer who is based in New York City and Shanghai, best known for her research based projects addressing her Stockholm Syndrome relationship with the Chinese internet such as The Blind Spot (2007), Chinternet Plus (2016), and online culture inside the Great Firewall. Her works inhabit multiple forms including paintings, websites, installations, machine learning software, VR and videos; highlight the attempts to discuss mainstream technology and contemporary consciousness and its impact on our daily lives, along with the new modes of politics, aesthetics and consciousness created during the representation of reality through technology.

== Early life and education ==
Miao Ying is the first generation of Chinese contemporary artists who grew up with the internet, one-child policy, reform and opening up and educated in both the East and West. She grow up in Shanghai, graduated in 2007 with a Bachelor in Fine Arts degree from the China National Academy of Fine Art's New Media Art department in Hangzhou, China, and earned a Master in Fine Arts degree in Electronic Integrated Arts from Alfred University, a statutory college of the State University of New York in 2009.

In order to get into a good art school in China, Miao Ying was classically trained in Russian style Socialist realism paintings and drawings since childhood. After her foundation year in collage, she gave up the opportunity of going to the oil painting department and chose New Media Art. The New Media Art department at CAA is the first new media art department in China, Miao Ying was in the premier class. It covers a wide range of disciplines from contemporary art history, photography, video art, 3-D animation to programming. Miao Ying studied with Chinese avant-garde pioneers, including Zhang Peili 张培力 and Geng Jianyi 耿建翌 among others. At graduation, Miao Ying earned salutatorian status, allowing her automatic induction to the Masters program, however decided to attend graduate school in the United States.

== Work ==
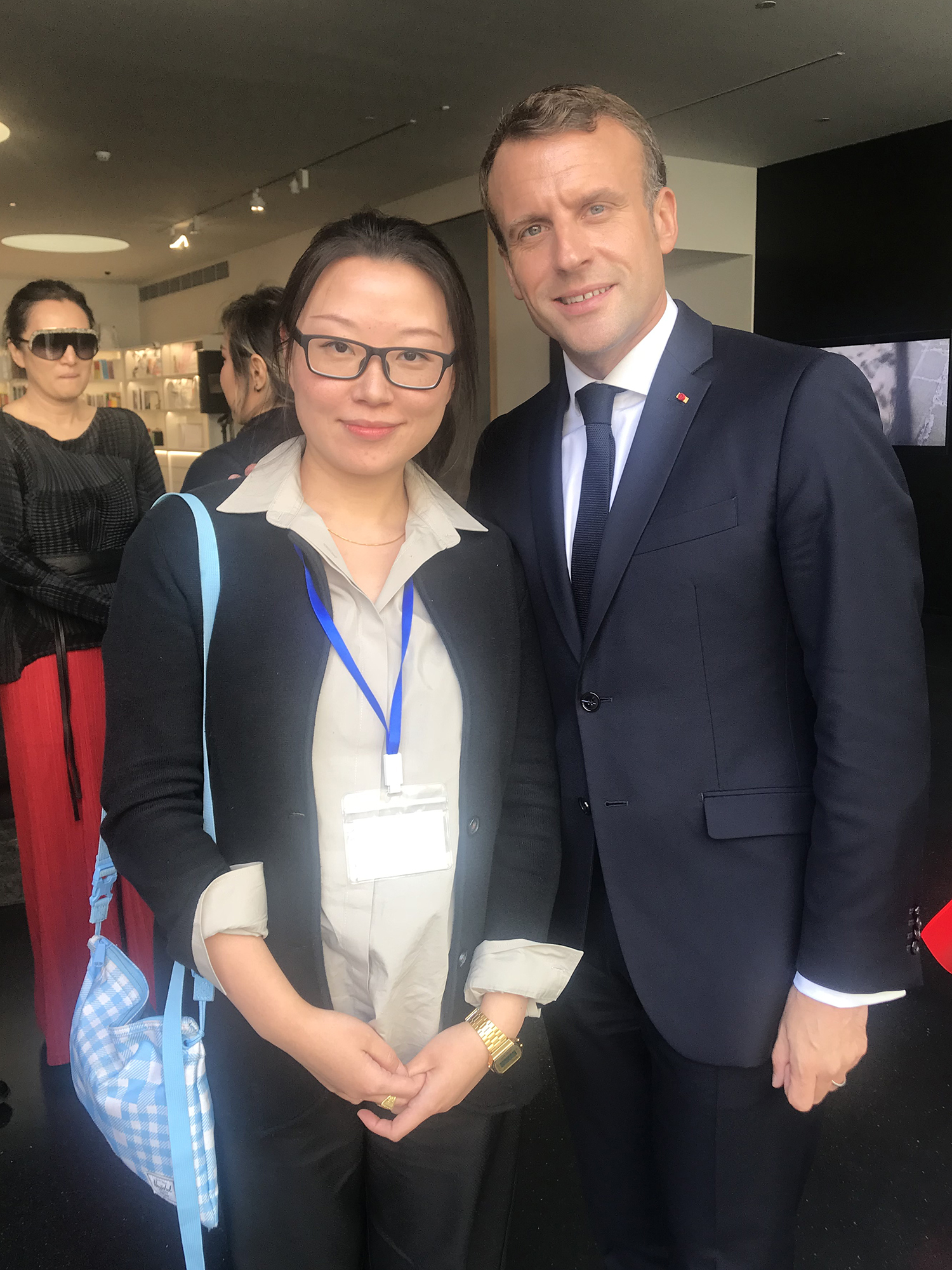
Miao Ying and Emmanuel Macron at a private meeting in 2019.

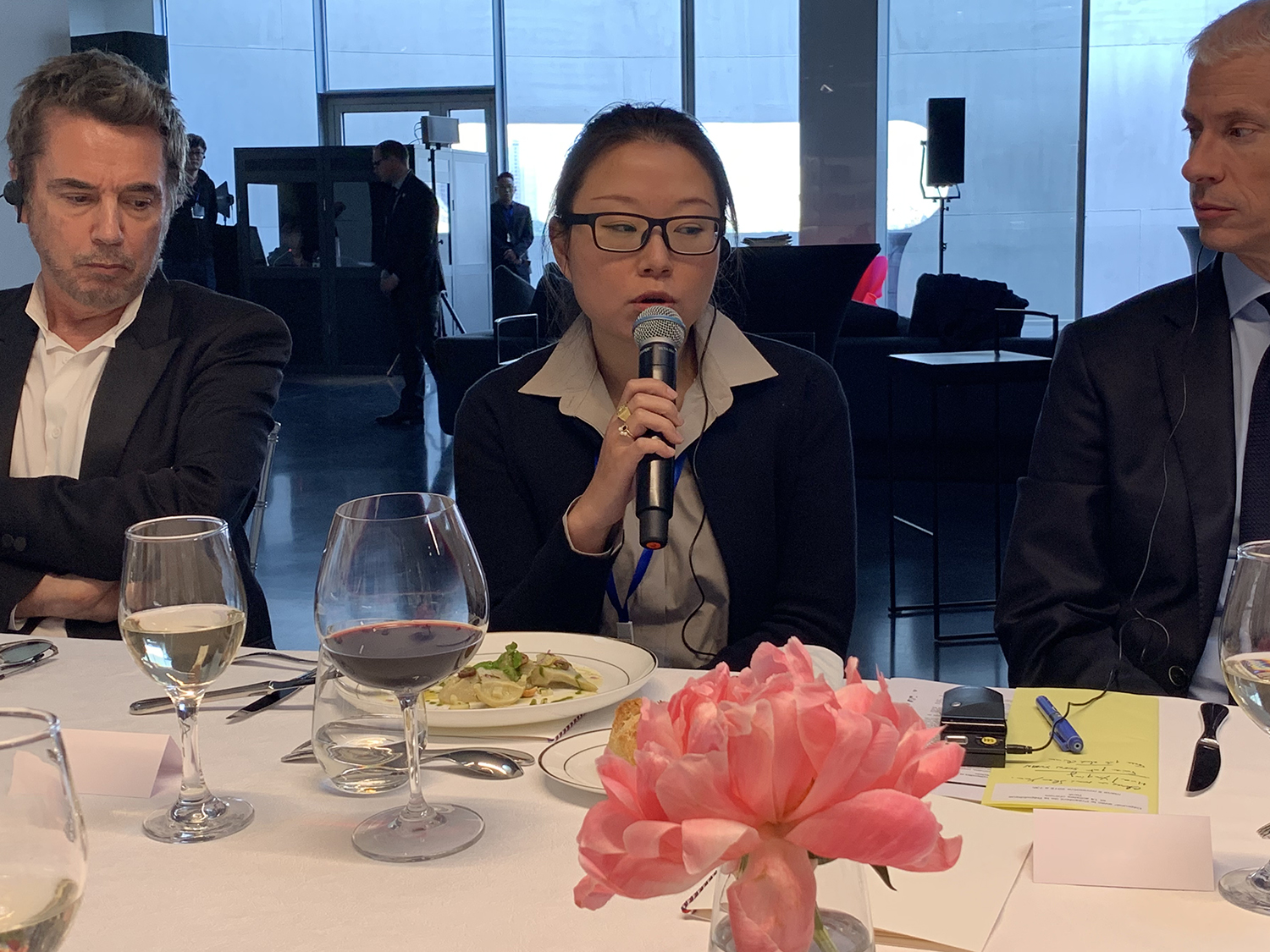
Miao Ying presents her practice to Macron with Jean-Michel Jarre among other artists in 2019

Early works and Chinese Internet Culture

Miao Ying's initial work focused on censorship and self censorship on the Chinese internet through projects like The Blind Spot] (2007), where the artist created a dictionary out of the words censored from google.cn. She continues to create work primarily online, often using GIFs, lo-fi visual elements, and drawing from the Kitsch visual style of major Chinese websites like Taobao and Baidu.

Her work and writings allows users outside China to get a glimpse of life within the Great Firewall and explores in a humorous way, the visual language born from the internet and its effect on users as they interact with it. She also works with Bilibili, a video-sharing website where user's comments appear over the video in real time, as in her web-based installation work iPhone Garbage (2014). This technique of information overload is also a source of inspiration for Miao's practice; she uses the term naodong (脑洞), Internet slang literally meaning "brain hole", derived from naobu, or "brain supplement." On July 8-August 7, 2015, she exhibited a series of GIFs of websites blocked in China titled "Holding a Kitchen Knife to Cut the Internet Cable" at the Chinese Pavilion at the 56th Venice Biennale.

Blind Spot -Words Censored by Google.cn, (2007, artist book)

The Blind Spot (2007) is an 1869-page Mandarin dictionary that has been manually annotated to indicate 2,000 search terms that were censored in China at the time. To make the list, Miao took on the labor-intensive task of searching every word on google.cn. If the search results returned with “According to local laws, some search results are not showing,” in the bottom of the page, Miao would erase the word with white tape.

In 2021, Miao Ying released "Evil Words" series in non-fungible token which was the first time ever that the artist had revealed the listed words that were censored by Google. Miao Ying named the NFT project Evil Words (2021) after Google's former motto 'don't be evil'. Subsequently, Google left China in 2010, leading other platforms such as Twitter, YouTube, Instagram, Facebook, and many other sites to be inaccessible. Google has kept its office in China and has been trying to come back to the Chinese market. In 2018 Google plans to launch a censored version of its search engine in China, code-named Dragonfly.

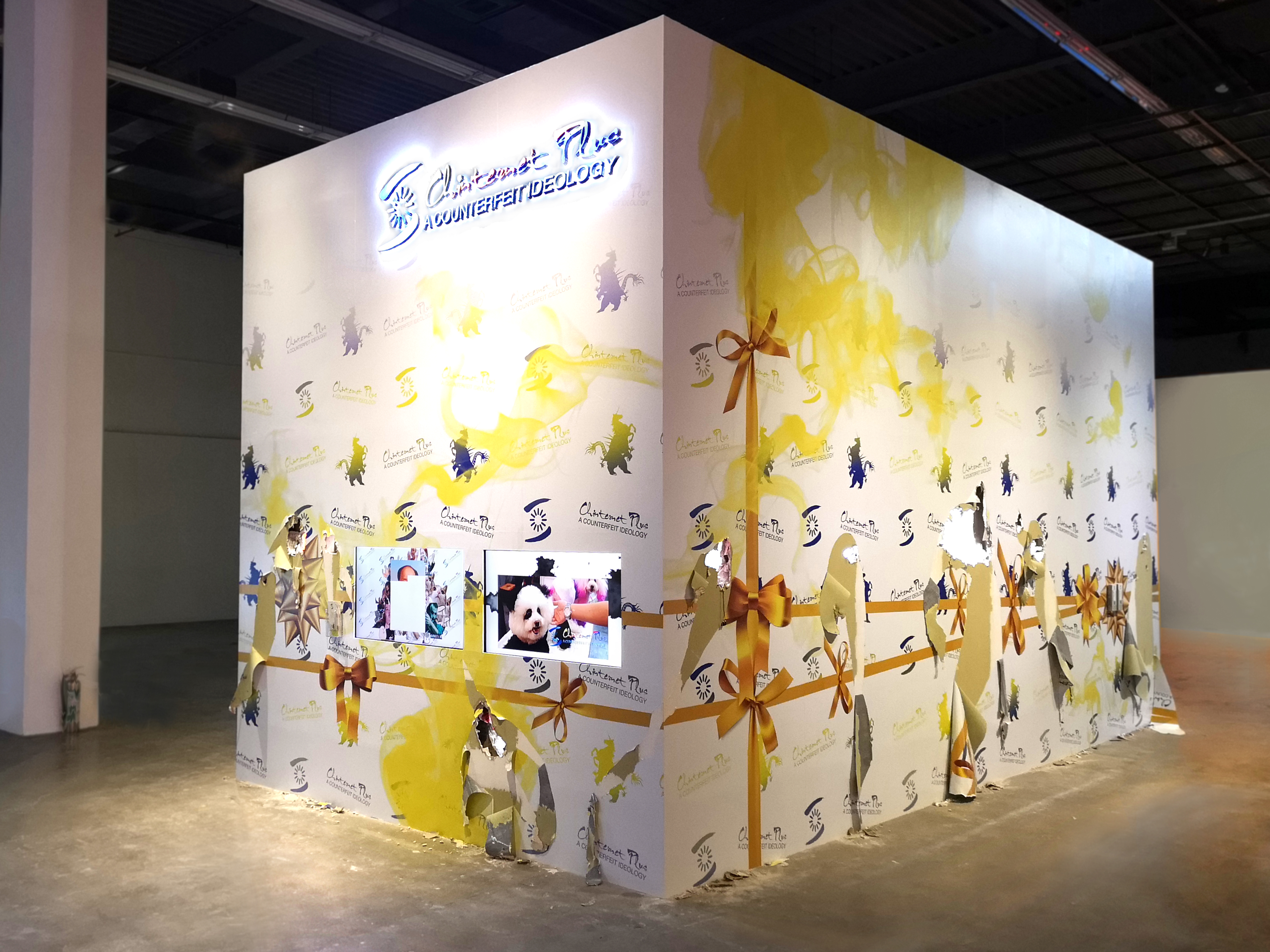
Chinternet Plus, Installation view, Gwangju Biennale, South Korea, 2018, Miao Ying

Recent Internet Installation projects

Chinternet Plus (2016, website, mixed media installation)

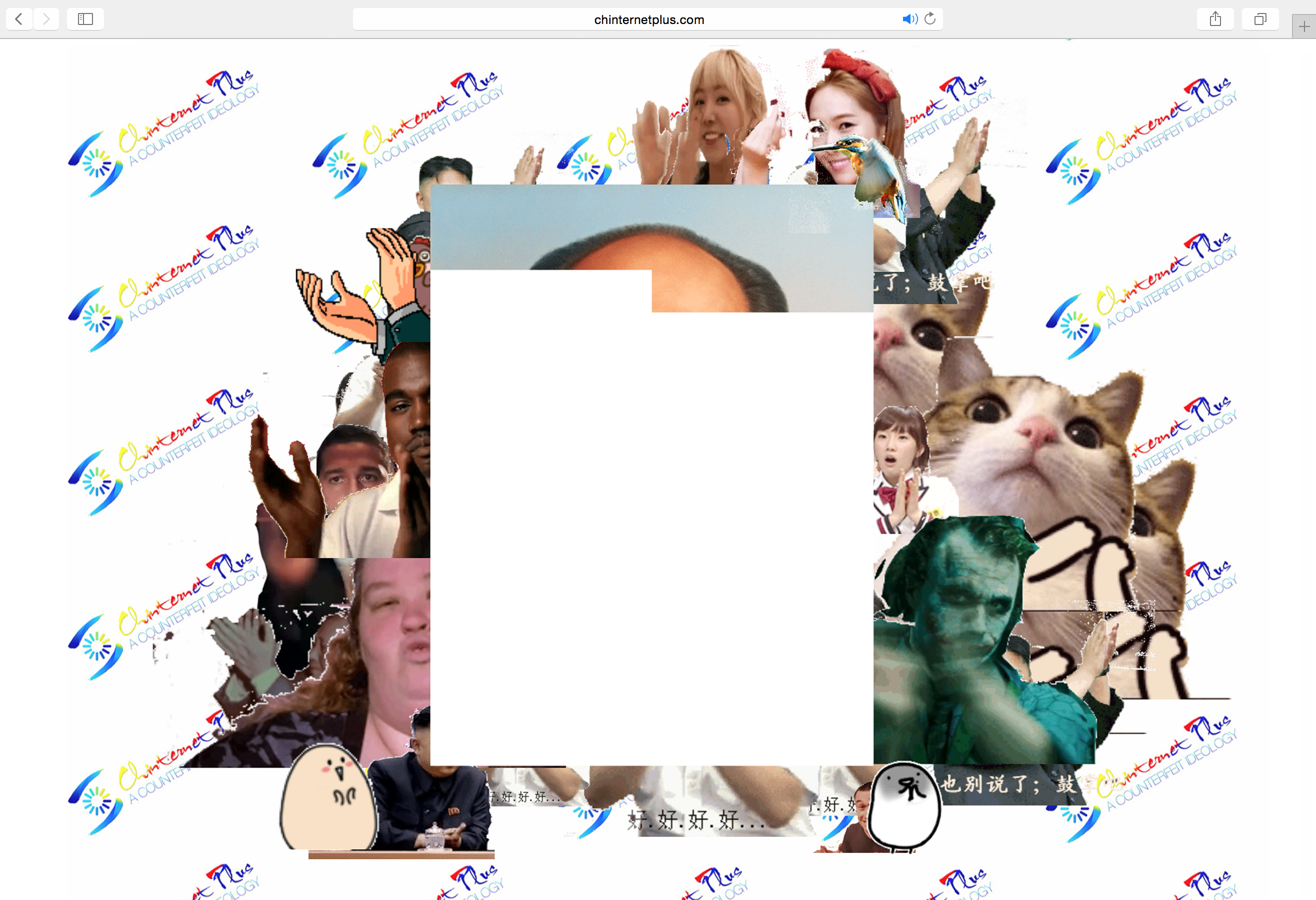
Chinternet Plus, website, 2016, Miao Ying, commissioned by New Museum

"Miao Ying: Chinternet Plus" was curated by Lauren Cornell, and commissioned by the New Museum. Chinternet Plus a counterfeit ideology that is based on a real Chinese ideology called "Internet Plus". With Chinternet Plus, Miao returned to a sharp critique in her work—this time of political branding.

As viewers scroll through Chinternet Plus, they encounter the five pillars of the Chinternet Plus “counterfeit” philosophy: “Our Story,” “Our Mystery,” “Our Goal,” “Our Vision,” and “Our Experience.” The work started as a website and turned into multi-media installation that including photos, videos, performances.

Hardcore Digital Detox (2018, website, mixed media installation)

Hardcore Digital Detox was curated by Ulanda Blair and commissioned by M+ Museum in Hong Kong, as their first work of digital commissions.

A companion to Miao’s well-known project Chinternet Plus (2016), Hardcore Digital Detox applies a thread of humor to a Strategic Lifestyle Advice tool with the seemingly illogical premise of offering an online retreat from the digital world and filter bubbles. It emphasizes the fallacy of a global internet culture while simultaneously underscoring the undemocratic use of networked power in both China and the United States. More than any of Miao’s previous projects, Hardcore Digital Detox interrogates the dialectical relationship between the Chinternet and the World Wide Web, unspooling and parodying complex issues of global capitalism, online propaganda, and media democracy.

Pilgrimage into Walden XII (2019 - present)

Since 2019, Miao Ying has been focusing on Artificial Intelligence. Her new project, "Pilgrimage into Walden XII", explored machine learning software on game engines and created new paintings in the theme of AI. The work creates a dystopian world where an all-seeing algorithm judges and controls individuals. These characters, depicted as cockroaches, must accumulate points to earn digital indulgences, navigating through ruins and a digital landscape that blends medieval aesthetics with futuristic elements.

Work Website

Chapter I: The Honor of Shepherds (2019-2020, live simulation software runs on computer)

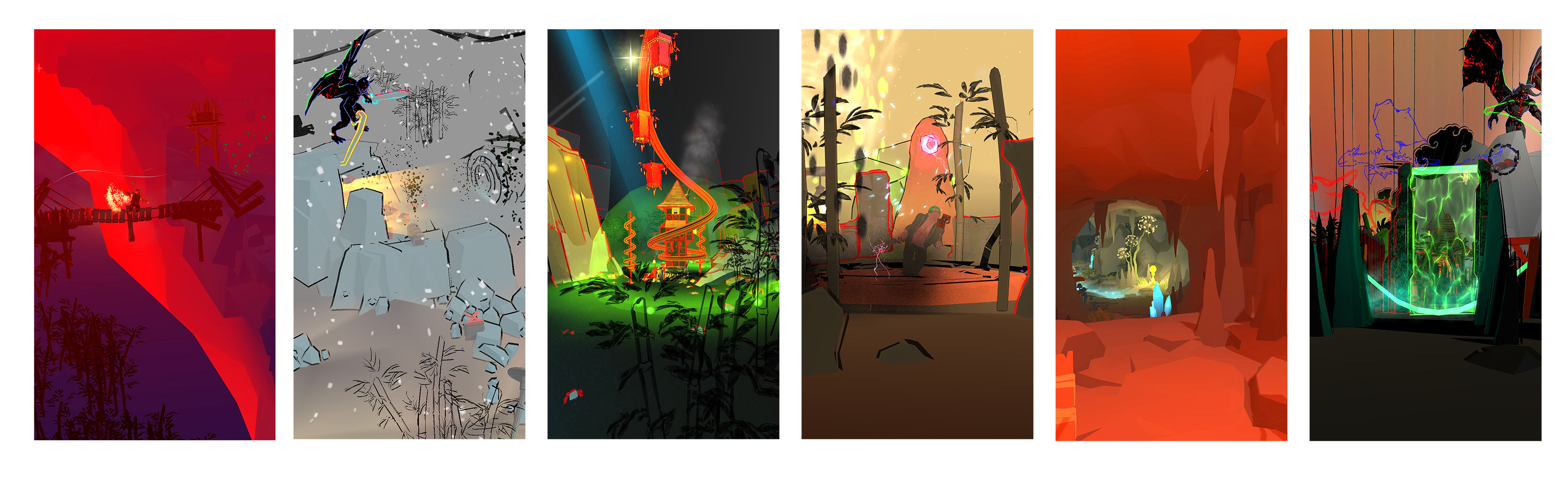
Pilgrimage into Walden XII, Chapter I: The Honor of Shepherds, 6 live simulation software, Infinite length, 2019-2020

“The Honor of Shepherds” takes place in a medieval magical fantasy land—Walden XII, created by Miao Ying, where a digital indulgence system is used. Walden XII refers to “Walden Two”, a utopian novel written by behavioral psychologist, B. F. Skinner about a society where perfect behavior is achieved as a result of reinforced positive conditioning of the desired behaviors, while meeting basic needs of citizens. In a structure similar to that of the medieval church, Walden XII is entitled to explain the ideological doctrine to its people and has implemented the technology to enforce citizen behavior, collect big data from its citizens, then rewards or punishes them according to their behavior score.

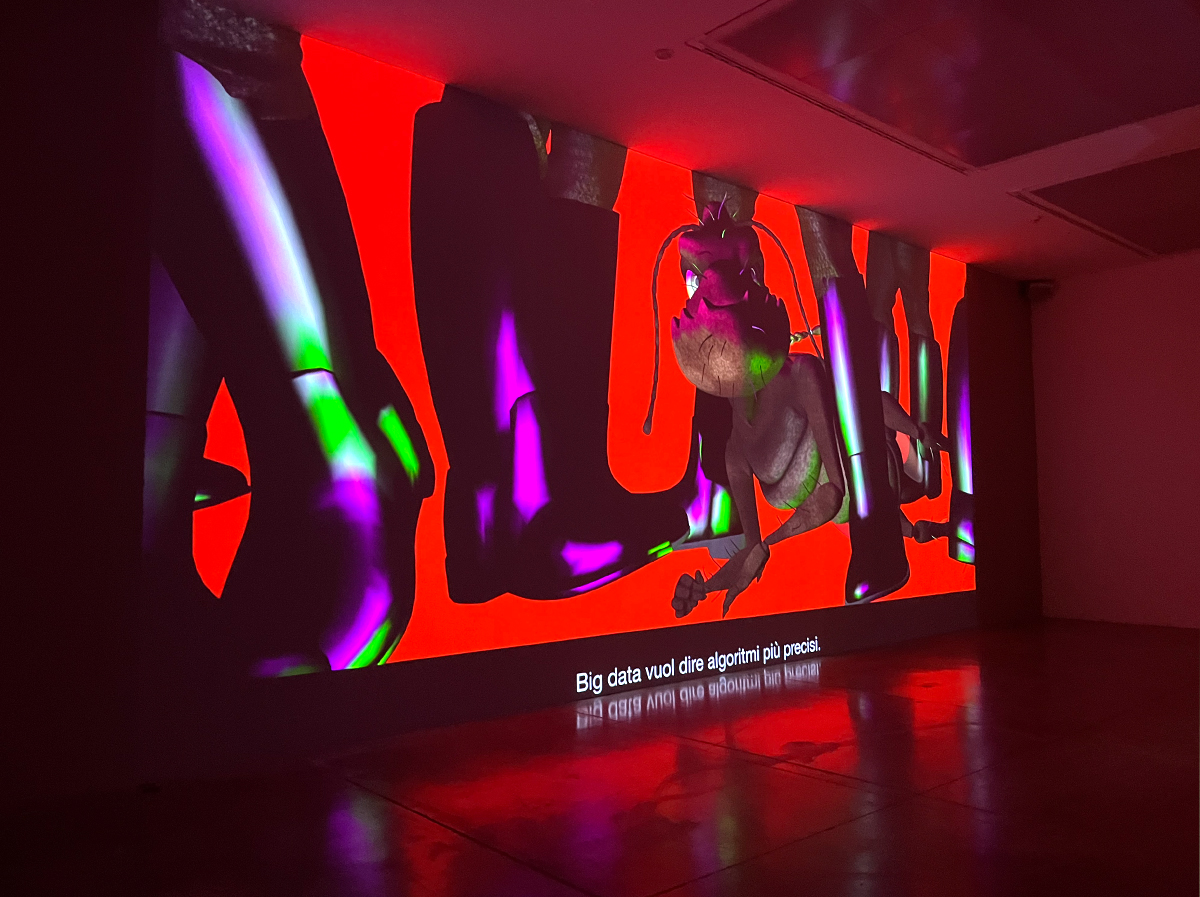
Chapter Two: Surplus Intelligence, Installation view at Museo d'Arte Moderna di Bologna, Italy, 2022, Miao Ying

Chapter II: Surplus Intelligence ( 2021-2022, film written by AI)

In 2022, Miao Ying directed a movie Surplus Intelligence that was written by GPT3, commissioned by Museo d'Arte Moderna di Bologna. Surplus Intelligence Film, 5k resolution 33’27” 2021-2022 “Surplus Intelligence” is a film that was written by Artificial Intelligence, simulated on a game engine, and directed by the artist. Using Machine Learning Text Generation Neural Networks and Generative Pre-trained Transformer 3, the artist trained the AI to study different styles of writing, including behavioral psychologist, B. F. Skinner’s utopia novel, “Walden Two''; the most popular Chinese online novel style “ 霸道总裁体 ”/ soft-core sadomasochistic Cinderella story depicting a domineering boss; opposing ideological theories; and bible stories.

The artist was able to develop a quest style romantic story between a citizen roach and the AI “The Sophisticated King of the Night, Brain L1t3rat1”, who is monitoring her behavior. The allegory taking place in a medieval magical fantasy land—Walden XII, is where a medieval papal indulgence system is used with digital bitcoin. In a structure similar to that of the medieval church, Walden XII is entitled to explain the ideological doctrine to its people and has implemented the technology to enforce citizen behavior, collect big data from its citizens, then reward or punish them according to their behavior score. One day, AI “Brain L1t3rat1” stole the magic power stone of Walden XII which resembles a burrito. In order to pay off his sin in the indulgence system, the roach has to go to another fantasy land with conflicting ideological magics and spells—Kingdom of United Nostalgic, where all the bitcoin mines are, and is haunted by free market ghosts...

=== Paintings ===
“Effect” series,

oil on caves ( 2016-ongoing)

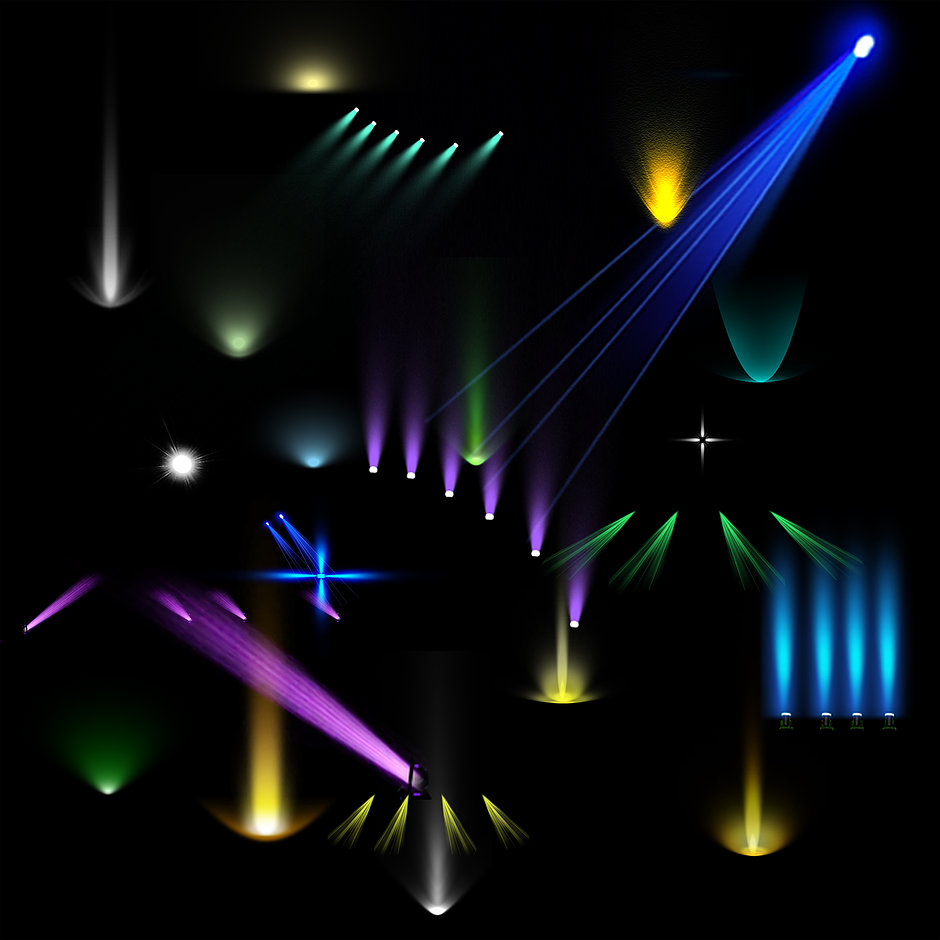
Miao Ying, Effect NO.3, oil on canvas, 150 cm x 150 cm, 2017

"Effect #" is a series of oil painting on caves that was ordered on taobao.com. Those paintings was painted by a skilled painter from Da Fen Village in Shenzhen, China, a village famous for counterfeiting the world’s most famous oil paintings for example, the Mona Lisa. The content of the painting is a set of lighting effects that are used in Photoshop. Special effects, which are supposed to enhance the subject, have become more emphasized than the subject or content itself. The idea of computer-generated effects is to make an image look as real as possible, however having a person copy computer effects like a flesh printer sets a paradox for the original purpose of this effect.

Prototype series,

folding screen, wood, oil on canvas (2018-ongoing)

Prototype is a series of folding screen installation with wheels, they were originally inspired by eight prototypes of US President Donald Trump’s US-Mexico border wall being built near San Diego, instead of being giant, the Prototype folding screens are quite the opposite, they are foldable, portable, exotic and mysterious. Folding screen usually used as a life hack to improve Feng Shui in Chinese culture. Here artist had use the folding screen as a metaphor of Great Fire Wall. On the surface of the folding screen, there are digital icons created by the artist from computer, the elements are things that forbidden and romance; such as chins, fences, wire, roses, etc.

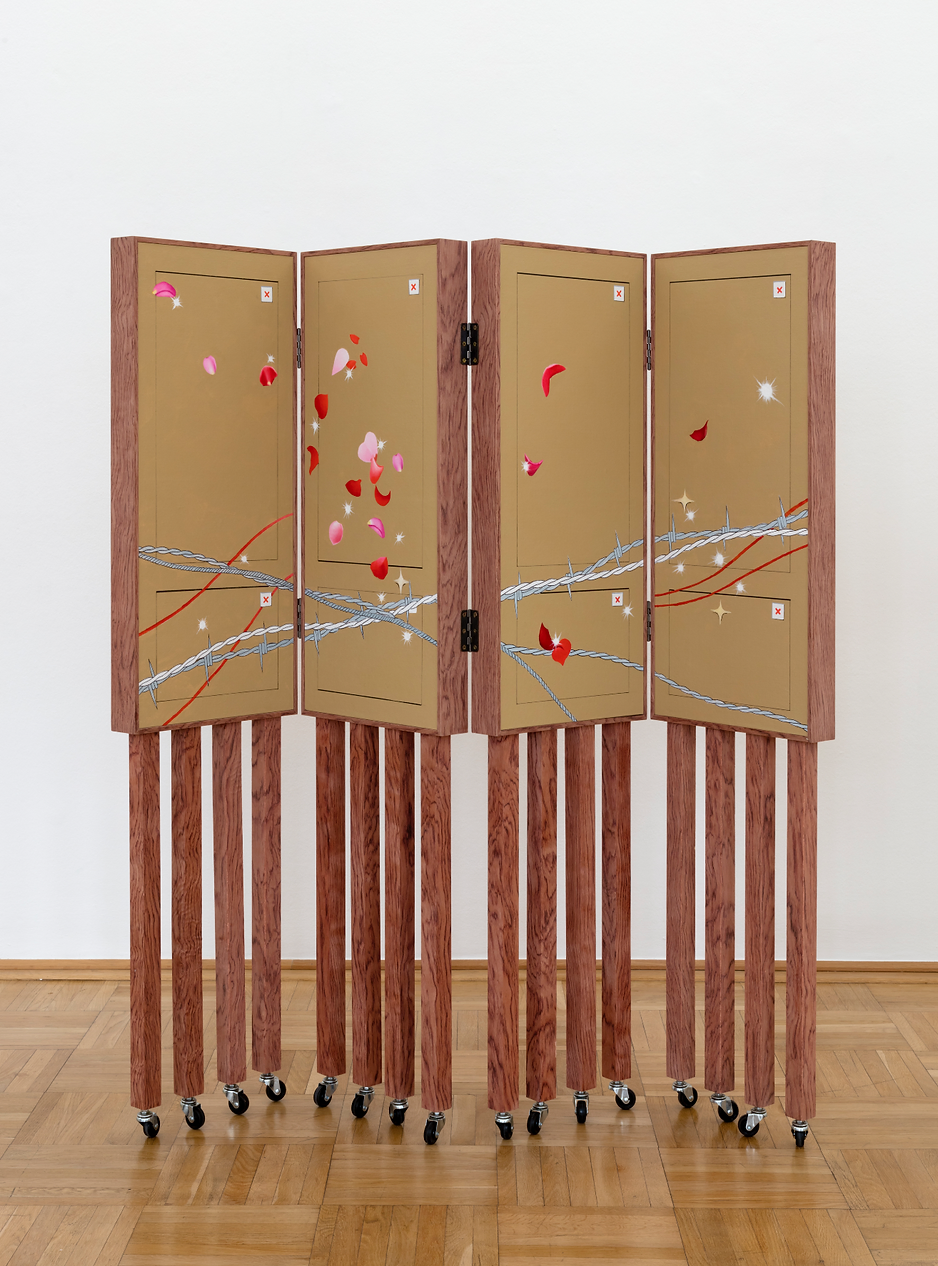
Miao Ying, Prototype #3, folding screen, wood, oil on canvas 165 x 160 x 7 cm, 2018

== Selected exhibitions ==
Her most recent solo exhibitions include: Pilgrimage into Walden XII, (OVR:Pioneers, Art Basel, 2021), Miao Ying: A Field Guide to Ideology, (Art Museum at the University of Toronto, 2021)", "Hardcore Digital Detox", (M+ Museum, Hong Kong, 2018) "Miao Ying：Chinternet Plus", First Look: New Art Online (New Museum, New York, 2016), "Holding a Kitchen Knife to Cut the Internet Cable" (Chinese Pavilion, Venice Biennale, 2015). She has shown her works at "Facing the collector", (Castello di Rivoli, Turin, Italy, 2020), "The Art Happens Here: Net Art's Archival Poetics" (New Museum, New York, 2019), "Vienna Biennale 2019", (Kunsthalle Vienna, Austria, 2019), "The 12th Gwangju Biennale" (Gwangjiu, South Korea, 2018), "Art Night London", (Hayward Gallery, London, 2018), "All I know is what's on the internet" (The Photographers' Gallery, London, 2018), "Shanghai Beat" (Contemporary Art Museum Kumamoto, Kumamoto, Japan, 2018), ".com/.cn" (MoMA PS1, K11 Art Foundation, 2017), "After Us" (New Museum, K11 Art Foundation, 2017)", The New Normal—Art and China in 2017" (UCCA For Contemporary Art, Beijing, 2017), "Secret Surface" (Kunst-Werke Institute for Contemporary Art, Berlin, 2016), etc. She is the winner of Porsche Young Chinese Artist of the year 2018–19.
