= Bu Hua =

Chinese digital artist (born 1973)

- Born: Bu Hua; 1973 (age 52–53); Beijing, China
- Occupation: Artist
- Known for: Digital Animation
- Notable work: Cat

Chinese name
- Simplified Chinese: 卜桦
- Hanyu Pinyin: Bǔ Huà
- Wade–Giles: Pu^{3} Hua^{4}
- IPA: [pùxwâ]

Bu Hua (卜桦; born 1973) is a digital artist based in Beijing, China, best known for her flash animation works.

== Early life and education ==
Bu was born in 1973. The daughter of a well-known printblock artist, Bu had an early introduction to art and in 1983, when only 10 years old, her painting Sun Bird Flower and I was selected by the China Post and issued as a stamp as part of a "children's paintings election" (special stamp T86). In 1985, the Hong Kong Arts Centre hosted a small exhibition wall of Bu's work.

== Career ==
Although Bu majored in painting while at university, she discovered her passion for animation through her interest in film, and found that "Flash can help people realize their dream of being a filmmaker." An early adopter and pioneer of using Flash Animation, Bu's Cat animation went viral upon its release in 2002.

Influenced by the work of William Kentridge while in Germany, she hoped to similarly combine drawing, painting and animation. In recent years she has developed a central character to a number of her video and illustrative works, based on Bu as a child. Through the perspective of this alter ego figure, her work explores the tulmultuous social landscape. “In modern China, how could you not be influenced by this fusion of West and East, this cultural invasion and ‘soft power’? I am just reflecting this reality."

== Works ==
- Cat (2002), Flash
- Savage Growth (2008), Flash
- Maomao's Summer
- Wisdom, Picture book,
- The Best Has Already Come (2017)
