= Alice Kok =

Macau artist and curator

Alice Kok (born 1978) is a visual artist and curator from Macau. Her work has been nominated for the Hong Kong Independent Film and Video Award, and has represented Macau at the Venice Biennale. She is the president and a curator at Art for All, a non-profit organisation in Macau dedicated to promoting Macau artists. She has curated and exhibited several projects in Macau.

== Biography ==
Kok was born in Macau in 1978, and studied visual communication at the Macau Polytechnic Institute. She later moved to France, earning a Bachelor's and a master's degree in Fine Arts from the Toulouse School of Fine Arts in 2002 and 2004, respectively. She has spent several years traveling in India and Tibet, and currently divides her time between Lhasa, in Tibet and Macau. She has been active in supporting Tibetan refugees.

== Career ==
Kok won a grant from La DRAC Ile-de-France in 2006 to create the film Karabic OK. In 2007, she made a second film, Yet in Exile: Family Script, based on her travels in Tibet and India. The film was well-received critically, and was a finalist for the Hong Kong Independent Film and Video Award in 2009. Yet in Exile: Family Script was also selected for screening at the Gwanju Biennale, in 2010.

In 2011, Kok's art project, Passing-Green Island, was selected to represent Macau at the Venice Biennale. She has since had five solo exhibitions in Macau.

Kok makes video, installations, drawings, and writing in her art projects. She represents several themes, including multiculturalism, religious themes drawn from Buddhism, and post-colonial concerns of identity.

Kok is the editor of a Chinese art magazine, CLOSER, and also teaches as a visiting professor at the Macau Institute of Tourism, the University of St. Joseph, and the Macau University of Science and Technology. She has been the director of the Artists Association of Macau's Art For All Society, a significant non-profit organization dedicated to promoting local Macau art, since 2014, and was also the director for a literary festival in Macau named 'The Script Road'. She is a curator at the Women Artists International Biennial in Macau.
