= Marguerite Müller-Yao =

Marguerite Müller-Yao (Chinese: 姚慧; pinyin: Yao Hui; (25 October 1934 in Peking, Republic of China – 21 September 2014 in Düsseldorf) was a Chinese-German painter and art historian. The aim and main subject of her artistic and scientific works were the cultural relations and influences between China and the West.

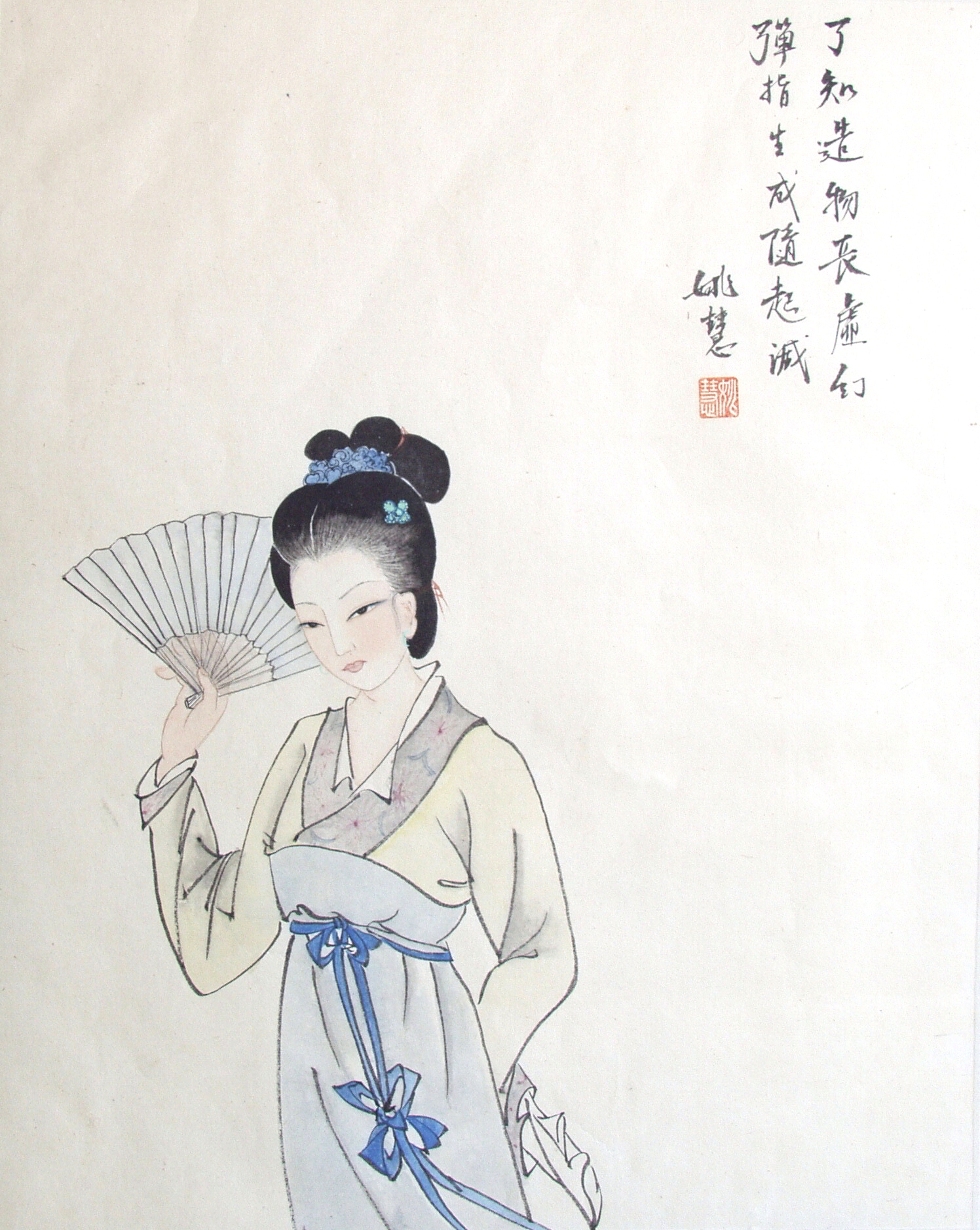
Chinese Lady with Fan 1982

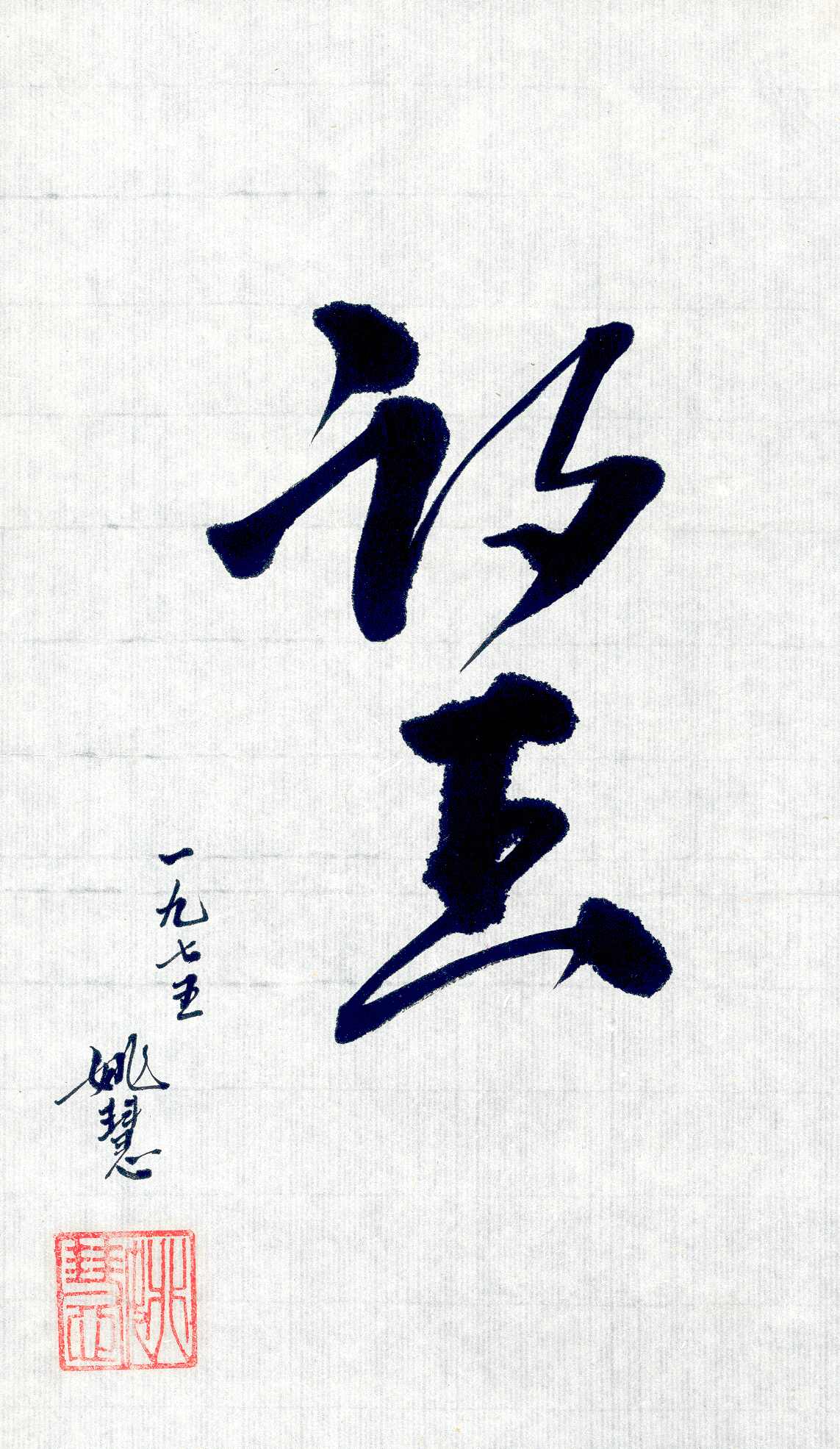
Chinese Calligraphy (Wang=Hope) 1975

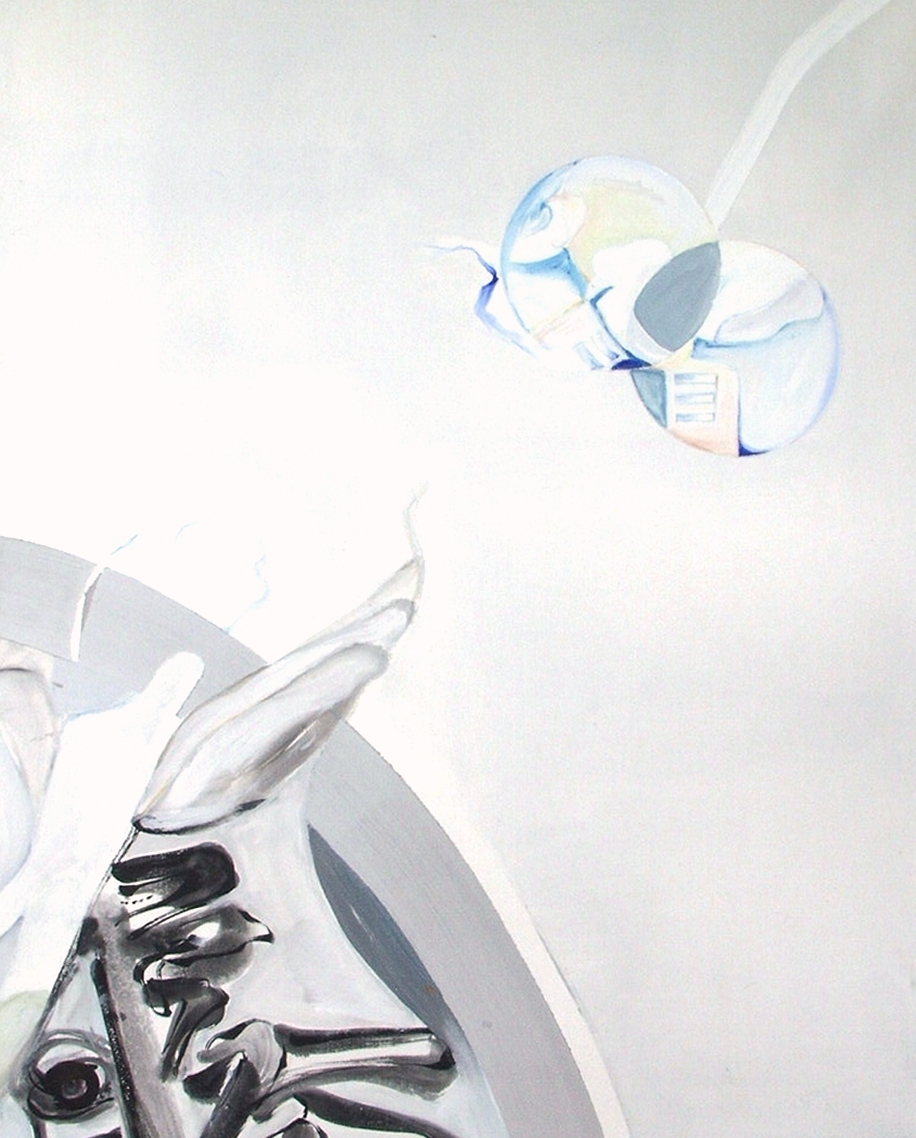
Heaven and Earth 1970

== Life ==
Dr. Marguerite Müller-Yao lived from 1949 to 1964 in Taipei/Taiwan, Republic of China. There she received an education as painter and Calligrapher from Pu Ru (Pu Xinyu (溥 心 畬)).

Since September 1964, she lived in Germany. From 1966 until 1974, she studied at the Staatliche Kunstakademie Düsseldorf with Joseph Fassbender (1966–1969) and Gert Weber called Weberg (1969–1974) and in 1974 passed the First State Examination for the Arts Teaching Profession. From 1974 until 1977, she was active as a lecturer at the University of Bonn Studio for Arts Education. Marguerite Müller-Yao received a doctorate (PhD) in 1985 at the University of Bonn with her studies of Arts History, East Asian Arts History and Sinology with Eduard Trier, Eleanor von Erdberg and Rolf Trauzettel and with a dissertation about the Influence of Chinese Calligraphy on Western Informel Painting.

From 1964 until 2012, she also participated as a painter at various national and international art exhibitions.

== Scientific works ==
- Kalligraphie im graphischen Werk von G. Hoehme. In: Katalog G. Hoehme. Kunstmuseum Düsseldorf und Institut für Moderne Kunst Nürnberg, 1975
- Der Einfluss der Kunst der chinesischen Kalligraphie auf die westliche Informelle Malerei. Dissertation Bonn, Köln 1985, ISBN 3-88375-051-4
- Informelle Malerei und chinesische Kalligraphie. In: Informel, Begegnung und Wandel. Schriftenreihe des Museums am Ostwall Dortmund , Band II, Dortmund 2002, ISBN 3-611-01062-6, S. 322–347.
- The Influence of Chinese Calligraphy on Western Informel Painting, 402 p., 155 Illustrations, Düsseldorf 2015, ISBN 978-3-00-048980-8
