= Nancy Sheung =

Female photographer from Hong Kong, active in 1960s and 1970s

- Born: Sheung Wai Chun; October 10, 1915; Suzhou, China
- Died: January 17, 1979 (aged 63); Hong Kong
- Citizenship: Chinese
- Occupation: photographer

Nancy Sheung (Chinese: 常惠珍; Oct. 10, 1915 (Note: Some sources say 1914)–Jan. 17, 1979) was a Hong Kong photographer known for her bold lines and frequent focus on female subjects. She was most active in the 1960s and 1970s.

== Early life ==
Nancy Sheung was born Sheung Wai-chun in Suzhou, China, in 1914 or 1915. She told her husband and family that she paid for her education by working in an opium den, and she rode a horse to school with a shotgun for safety; her family has stated that these stories should be taken with a grain of salt.

== Personal life ==
Sheung married merchant Pong Kuan-Wah in the mid-1930s. Together they moved to Hong Kong, where they had six children. Sheung founded and ran a construction company, Wai Foong Construction, sometimes acting as the family's primary breadwinner. In the late 1950s, the construction industry slowed down due to a sluggish economy, giving Sheung more time to focus on her photography.

== Photography career ==
After attending a European photography exhibit in the 1950s, Sheung became interested in photography in her 40s. She purchased her first camera, a Rolleiflex, and apprenticed to Michael Leung, a prominent local photographer. She joined the Photographic Society of Hong Kong in 1965, becoming its vice-president in the 1970s.

Sheung is known as one of the few female photographers of Hong Kong in the 1960s and 1970s; most of her contemporaries were men. She is also known for her use of dynamic, bold lines; portraits of women; architectural eye; and images of life in Hong Kong. Some of her most notable works include portraits of her daughter(s): The Pigtail, (Note: The Pigtail) The Long-Haired Girl (Note: The Long-Haired Girl) and Staircase. (Note: Staircase) Other interesting works include Zigzag, (Note: Zigzag) Under the Cross, (Note: Under the Cross) The Shadows, (Note: The Shadows) and Drum Yard. (Note: Drum Yard)

=== Exhibitions ===
- 23rd Hong Kong International Salon of Pictorial Photography 1968 (第廿三屆香港國際攝影沙龍). Hong Kong: The Photographic Society of Hong Kong, 1968.
- "Rare Encounters: Nancy Sheung's Portraits of Women in the 1960s" at Lumenvisum in March 2015.
- Exhibited at St Hugh's College, Oxford, in the Hamlin Gallery, from 15 October to 15 November, 2015.
- Sheung's work was exhibited at the Photo Oxford Festival in 2021, the first UK exhibition devoted to her work.

== Death ==
Sheung died of a heart attack in her darkroom in 1979.
