= Guo Yingguang =

Chinese photographer (born 1983)

- Born: 1983 (age 42–43)
- Education: Communication University of China; London College of Communication
- Known for: photography
- Notable work: The Bliss of Conformity
- Awards: Nominated at the Discovery award - International Photography Festival Jimei x Arles; Winner of Madame Figaro's Women Photographers award
- Website: yingguang.win

Guo Yingguang (Chinese: 郭盈光; pinyin: Guō Yíngguāng; born 1983) is a Chinese photographer. Her creations deal with social problems of contemporary China: women to marry, arranged marriages and pseudo-intimacy between husbands and wives victims of such marriages.

In 2017, Guo was nominated for the Discovery Award at the Jimei x Arles International Photography Festival. She is the first winner of Madame Figaro's Women Photographers Award in 2017.

== Biography ==
Guo Yingguang was born in Liaoning province, Northeast China in 1983. She moved to Beijing with her parents after elementary school. She studied photography at the Communication University of China in Beijing. She then worked as a photojournalist for different media companies such as Reuters, China Daily or Global Times. During these years, she photographed many street scenes for her work and also as a hobby. This experience led her interest to different social issues present in contemporary China. Her confrontation to the Shanghai marriage market brought her interest to the issue of arranged marriages. This issue is a centerpoint to her work: she developed it throughout the years and through her different projects (see The Happiness of Obedience; The Bliss of Conformity).

In 2016, she moved away from photojournalism to dedicate herself to a more artistic quest of photography: she started studying at the London College of Communication, University of the arts.

== Major projects ==
=== Peek Of the City ===
Peek of City is a series of urban photographies mixing photographs of roofs, walls, stairs, windows, blinds and textures. The project makes the connection between these elements through the spaces, colors, shapes and textures that reminds one of paintings.

=== The Happiness of obedience ===
This project begins when she discovers the Shanghai marriage market. In 2015, at the age of 34, she decides to create an artistic performance where she promotes herself with an advertisement of herself to find a companion, while filming the reactions of the people surrounding her. She also takes numerous photos. The Happiness of Obedience: a series of photos and videos, testifying people's reactions to her performance.

=== The Bliss of Conformity ===
The project The Bliss of Conformity is an exhibition project mixing different medias : video elements, photographs and a book created as part of the exhibition. Guo combines documentary photography and artistic creation to try to raise awareness of the current situation in China. Yingguang Guo develops the idea of her previous project The Happiness of Obedience. She continues to explore arranged marriages in China and the emotional distance that results from them. In addition to photographing daily scenes and personal ad details, Guo uses photogravure to create a series of abstract images that reveal the turbulence of seemingly quiet arranged marriages.

For this project Yingguang Guo is inspired by two feminists: Adrian Piper and the French psychoanalyst and philosopher Luce Irigaray. She is also inspired by the Japanese Daido Moriyama, master of street photography, and particularly his highly contrasted photographs in black and white during the years 1960–1970.

Yingguang Guo was nominated for her project: The Bliss of Conformity at the Discovery Award of the Jimei x Arles International Photo Festival 2017, as part of this festival she won Madame Figaro's Women Photographers Award.

Thanks to this award, her project The Bliss of Conformity was exhibited at the Rencontres d'Arles in 2018, and was published as a book by La Maison de Z.

== Exhibitions and awards ==
=== Exhibitions ===
- 2013 “The way” Himalayas Museum Shanghai
- 2016 “Irrelationship”. Interim show MA photography. London College of Communication. University of the Arts London, England, United Kingdom.
- 2016 “Wind,” London photo gallery, group exhibition London, England, United Kingdom.
- 2016 “three fold” UGLY DUCK London College of Communication MA photography
- 2017 “three fold” Builtifou Gallery, Hangzhou, Zhejiang, China
- 2017 Ningbo International Photography Week, Ningbo, Zhejiang, China
- 2017 “The Bliss of Conformity” Photobook Unseen Amsterdam 2017, Amsterdam
- 2017 Unique Gender (Genre Unique), Paris, France
- 2017 Jimei x Arles International Photo Festival, Xiamen, China
- 2018 Les Rencontres De La Photographie, Arles, France

=== Awards ===
- 2017 - winner of Madame Figaro's Women Photographers award
- 2017 'The Bliss of Conformity' nominated at the Discovery Award of the International Photography Festival Jimei x Arles
