= Luo Yang (photographer) =

Chinese photographer (born 1984)

Luo Yang (Chinese: 罗洋; born 1984) is a Chinese photographer, known for her photographs of women.

Yang was born in Shenyang and graduated from the Lu Xun Academy of Fine Arts in 2009 with a Bachelor of Fine Arts in graphic design.

She lives in Beijing and works with film only. Her work has been exhibited in multiple venues in China and Europe, including in Ai Weiwei's exhibition "FUCK OFF 2" (2013). In 2018, she was listed as one of BBC's 100 Women.

She worked on her series GIRLS from 2008 until 2017, gaining wide acclaim and touring the series through exhibitions around the world. GIRLS focused on Chinese women born in the 80s, highlighting lesser known subcultural elements with her candid photography.

A ten-year retrospective exhibition "GIRLS" in Bangkok and Paris was curated by Moonduckling and produced by Annette Fausboll, Jean-Alexandre Luciani and Julien Favre.

Her latest series, YOUTH, was shot throughout 2019, focusing on Chinese youth born in the 90s. She has also appeared in exhibitions in Berlin and Paris.
