= Luo Wei (artist) =

Chinese visual artist

Luo Wei (Chinese: 罗苇; born in 1989) is a Chinese visual artist working in performance, photography, painting, theatre, audio and installation art. She frequently integrates various media into her art, drawing inspiration from science and biology. Her creative practice also involves collaboration and a strong emphasis on academic research. Often, she is the subject of her own art.

== Biography ==
Luo Wei was born in Guangzhou, China, in 1989. She graduated from Guangzhou Academy of Fine Art High School in 2008, and received a BFA degree in oil-painting from the China Central Academy of Fine Arts in 2012. Luo now lives and works in Beijing.

== Artworks ==
Luo's art is based on observing and intervening in the world and juxtaposes subjectivity and objectivity. In oil painting to installation art, she takes inspiration from traditional Chinese ink painting.

=== CP - Crystal Planet ===
Crystal Planet is the field created by microscopic (2014-). In its online form, she shares it with people from all over the world. The project developed with a team and involved the interaction with viewers by inviting the audience to participate or encouraging the netizens to structure parts of the planet in order to form a pluralistic world for people to visit, browse and renovate.

The first Crystal Planet Carnival was opened at Amy Lee Gallery.

== Select solo exhibitions ==
- 2015 Crystal Planet, Amy Li Gallery, Beijing, China
- 2014 What we talk about when we talk about ARTIST, Amy Li Gallery, Beijing, China
- 2012 Spectator, Germany
