= Zhu Lan Qing =

Chinese photographer

- Born: 2 May 1991 (age 35); Dongshan Island, Fujian Province, China
- Occupations: artist, photographer

Chinese name
- Traditional Chinese: 朱嵐清
- Simplified Chinese: 朱岚清
Transcriptions
- Website: http://julanching.com/

Zhu Lan Qing (Chinese: 朱嵐清; born 1991, in Fujian, China) is a contemporary Chinese photographer now living in Taipei. She graduated with a master's degree from the Department of Photojournalism at Renmin University of China in 2012 and moved to Taiwan to study at the Institute of Applied Arts in Fu Jen Catholic University.

== Background ==
Zhu's works, most related to home, travel, explore and strangeness, have been published in magazines and shown at photography festivals internationally, including the FORMAT International Festival and Lianzhou International Photo Festival. Her photobook was selected as for the PHOTOEYE's Best Books of 2012. She also won the Three Shadows Photography Award in 2014 and the Barcelona International Photography Awards in 2015.

When Zhu was in secondary school, she was more interested in the village she lived in, especially the old houses going to disappear. Thus, she started photographing them and that was the first time she picked up her grandfather's camera and created something. At the time that digital camera being popular, her parent bought her one which was a Taiwan brand called PREMIER.

Zhu considered photography not only as a way of expression, but also as a story to tell. She desired to express through photography and this is the reason that photography came into her life.

When Zhu left Dongshan Island, the place she spent her childhood, she started to have the concept of home. Suffering from homesickness allowed Zhu to record her feelings to home with camera. Zhu's mother worked in local tourism, so Zhu knew her hometown through the tourist brochures in her childhood. Deciding to take photos of her hometown, she bought a map and explored some places she had never been to. At the beginning of her tour, she took the bus, and later bought a motorcycle to travel around and took photos. Zhu believed that this trip allowed her to get the whole picture of the town.

At first, she did not have a clear plan but by constantly walking everywhere in Dongshan, discovered the places with her lens. She focused on the beautiful beaches, construction sites and festive holiday scenes with the lens. However, her trips in hometown were not supported by everyone. Once she met a shepherd in woods and tried to take photos of the sheep, she found herself and the shepherd were in the same age. Zhu was curious because their different backgrounds caused them doing something completely different, so she wanted to take a photo of the shepherd. He was not willing to be photographed, but after Zhu explained her motivation, he finally agreed. After she got back to her home in Dongshan's village, Zhu also used the camera to record the scene at home, including the fish in sink, grandma's hair and old boxes. She also found a magenta embroidered wedding dress from her grandma's box, wearing it and taking photos. This photo became her handmade book cover which impressed the reader a lot.

In the next three years, Zhu clarified the context of the creation. She made a photo album with four sections which were "Bachimen", "Home", "Food, Land, God" and "Sea". In her eyes, Bachimen was the connection between the land and the Dongshan Island. Once she smelled the sea from Bachimen, she knew she was home.

== Artworks ==
=== Project ===
- All about my grandma (2012–13), Dongshan Island, Fujian, China

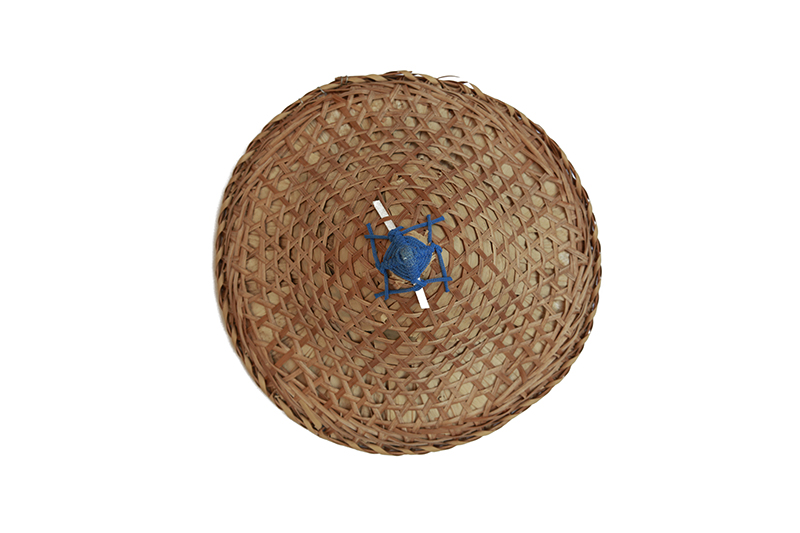
Project: All about my grandma

- Meet Strangers (2011-2012), Beijing / Wuhan / Dalian, China

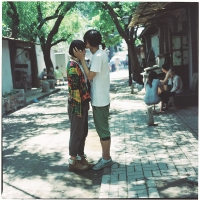
Project: Meet Strangers

=== Handmade book ===
- A Journey In Reverse Direction (2013-2015), Dongshan Island, Fujian, China

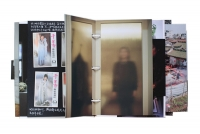
Handmade book: A Journey In Reverse Direction

- Meet Strangers (2012/4)

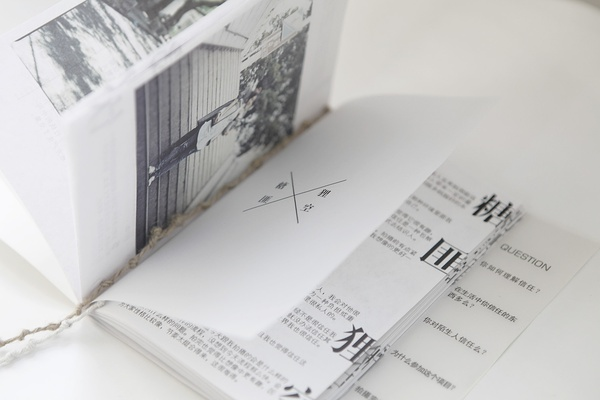
Handmade book: Meet Strangers

=== Installation view ===
- 1(2014), Three Shadows Photography Art Centre, Beijing, China

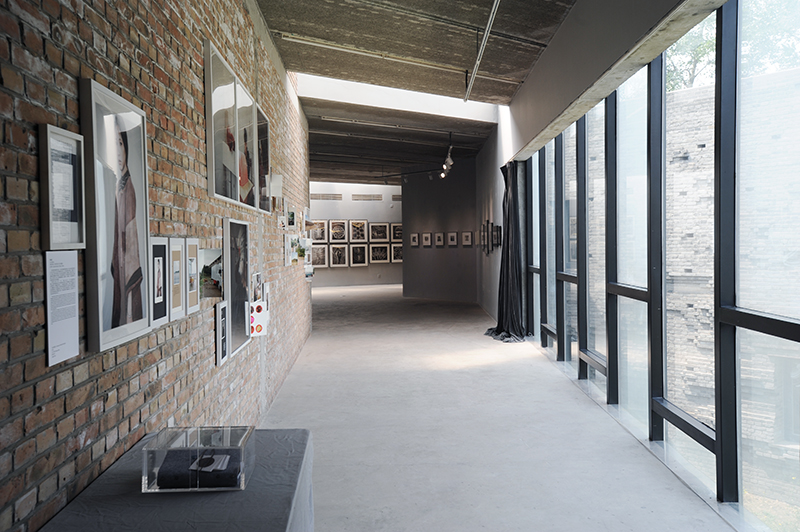
Installation: 1

== Technique ==
Zhu Lanqing's project is developed from existing photographs, and references Deleuze's concept of the "arborescent" in the title. Here, the "lateral roots" are elements other than the main subject of the photograph, often captured inadvertently by the photographer, and sometimes with greater significance. The images here are selected from the project's first series "Photographs within Photographs."

Works in the "landscape / quotidian" section deal with themes of urbanization and development. Her handmade photo book, which traces her return to her coastal hometown in Fujian province, connects the themes of landscape, quotidian, and memory in this section.
