= Tang Ying Chi =

Hong Kong artist (born 1956)

Tang Ying Chi 鄧凝姿
- Born: 1956 (age 69–70); Hong Kong
- Education: BA (Hons) in Fine Art, Goldsmiths College, University of London; Master of Find Art and Doctor of Fine Art, the Royal Melbourne Institute of Technology University
- Known for: Visual Art, Curator, Art Education

Tang Ying Chi (born 1956 in Hong Kong) is a Hong Kong based artist, curator, art administrator, art educator and editor. Tang is interested in a wide span of local issues including culture, identity and communication in the context of Hong Kong. She always seeks to explore these topics through her art works, from the identity issue of Hong Kong people during the pre- and post-handover period in 1990s to her recent research on the behaviour of people on the streets in Hong Kong.

== Education ==
Graduated with a BA (Hons) in Fine Art at the Goldsmiths College, University of London, England, in 1989, Tang was awarded Master of Fine Art and Doctor of Fine Art degrees at the Royal Melbourne Institute of Technology University in Australia in 2003 and 2008 respectively.

== Work ==
Tang has become active in Hong Kong art scene since 1990s and has been pursuing her career as an artist and art advocate in Hong Kong. In 2012, she was invited by the Hong Kong Design Institute as the Creator-in-Residency and the Faculty of Art of Chiangmai University in Thailand to participate in an Artist Residency programme. In 2010, she was the Artist-in-Residence at the Department of Visual Studies of Lingnan University. In 2008, she was honoured as one of the People of the Times by the British Council in Hong Kong as part of its 60th anniversary celebration. In 1996, Tang received the “Visual Art Award” in the Hong Kong Art Biennial.

== Collection ==
Tang's works has been collected by public institutions including the Hong Kong Museum of Art, Hong Kong Heritage Museum, Central Library of Sydney, as well as private collectors and art lovers.

== Recent exhibitions and art projects ==
2024

- Seven Weeks and Five Day :Tang Ying Chi X Tsang Chui Mei, Karin Weber Gallery, Hong Kong,

2021

- A Landscape Beyond: New Work by Dr. Tang Ying Chi, Art Next Gallery,Hong Kong.
- The Place- Fantasia of Scenery by Tang Ying Chi, Sun Museum, Hong Kong

2020

- Hong Kong Experience, Hong Kong Experiment, Hong Kong Museum of Art, Hong Kong.
- Hong Kong in Poor Images, curated by Dr. Zeng Hong, Ely Centre Contemporary Centre, New Haven, USA

2014

- We are street people - an interactive project, i-dArt Gallery, Hong Kong
- Take Them Home Art Project, JCCAC Handicraft Market, Hong Kong
- Art PopUP! @ PMQ, PMQ, Hong Kong
- Coming Home–Art Container Project Documentation and Art Exhibition, Koo Ming Kown Exhibition Gallery, HKBU Communication and Visual Arts Building, Hong Kong

2013

- These Streets Here Are So Nice - New work of Tang Ying Chi, Voxfire Gallery, Hong Kong
- Let's take a photo, Street people, various locations, Hong Kong

2010

- Walk-in Tuen Mun, A Residency Project at Lingnan University, Hong Kong

2008

- Art Container Project, West Kowloon Cultural District, Hong Kong

== Organisation ==
Tang is the founder of Art Readers which is an organisation that connects art practitioners, curates art exhibitions, encourages art writing and brings its members' research outcomes in print.
