= Yushi Li =

Chinese-born, London-based photographer

Yushi Li (born 1991) is a Chinese-born, London-based photographer whose work is concerned with the male gaze and the female gaze.

== Life and work ==
Li was born in Hunan province, China and now lives in London. She earned an MA in photography at the Royal College of Art in London and was, as of 2019, studying for a PhD in Arts and Humanities there.

Her photography, through series such as Your Reservation is Confirmed, My Tinder Boys, and Paintings, Dreams and Love, is concerned with the male gaze and the female gaze. "Her work has typically featured naked, white and Western men, shown as acquiescent or vulnerable, while she is clothed and assertive, meeting the viewer’s gaze."

== Publications with contributions by Li ==
- 209 Women. Liverpool: Bluecoat, 2019. ISBN 9781908457523.

== Exhibitions ==
=== Solo exhibitions ===
- Your Reservation is Confirmed, Fotogalleri Vasli Souza, Malmo, Sweden, 2019
- Women Act, Men Appear, Union Gallery, London, 2020/21

=== Group exhibitions ===
- 209 Women, Portcullis House, Parliament of the United Kingdom, London, 2018/2019; Open Eye Gallery, Liverpool, 2019

== See also ==
- Alix Marie
- Gender equality
