= Jidi (cartoonist) =

Chinese illustrator and cartoonist

Jidi (Chinese: 寂地; born June 22, 1983) is the pen name of Zu Yale (Chinese: 祖雅乐), a Chinese illustrator and cartoonist. She graduated from Southwest University for Nationalities. Her representative work is the My Way picture book series.

== Career ==
In June, 2002, Jidi, a student of department of painting in Southwest Institute for Nationalities (the predecessor of Southwest University for Nationalities), began to serialize the picture book, My Way, on Xinlei•STORY 100. In October 2004, the offprint of My Way was published. It sold well and was published in other countries. Jidi is known for her warm drawing style, coloring style, and emotional writing style. She lives in Dali, Yunnan.

== Works ==
| Year | Works |
|---|---|
| 2004 | < MY WAY 1> - My Way |
| 2005 | < MY WAY 2> -Time Ocean |
| 2006 | < MY WAY 3> - Blue cookie |
| 2007 | < MY WAY 4> - Spring scenery |
| 2008 | Novel <Tiptoe around time> |
| 2009 | < MY WAY 5> - If free |
| 2009 | The individual selected class <JIDI> |
| 2010 | short draw episode <Flying Cat> |
| 2010 | <Tiptoe around time 1> |
| 2011 | <Tiptoe around time 2> |
| 2012 | <Tiptoe around time 3> |
| 2013 | <Tiptoe around time 4> |

== My Way ==
This book series is episodic. The main character, V, is on the trip to an unknown destination. During his journey, he meets a number of lonely people with different stories, and sees sadness and happiness.

== Tiptoe around time ==
The story is about a high school girl who just starts to step into adult world of confusion and her inner world, Xiaolu Li’s castle and garden. She grows up in a single-parent family, often indulges in her fantasy world, and is very sensitive.
