= Yan Han (artist) =

Yan Han (Chinese: 彦涵; July 12, 1916 – September 26, 2011) was a Chinese artist and teacher.

Born in Donghai County, Jiangsu Province, Yan taught at North China University, and then at the Lu Xun Academy of Fine Arts in Shenyang; from 1949, he taught first at the China Art Academy, Hangzhou, and then, in 1950, at the Central Academy of Fine Arts. Yan participated in the First Congress of the All-China Art Workers' Association, held in 1949. His official posts have included chairman of the Chinese Printmakers' Association and standing director of the Chinese Artists' Association.

Yan Han began studying Chinese art and Western painting in 1935 at the National Art Academy, Hangzhou, then the center in China for teaching Western modernist styles. After war with Japan broke out, he went to Yan'an and, in 1938, entered the Lu Xun Academy of Literature and Arts to learn woodblock printing. In 1939 Yan went to the Taihang Mountains (in the Hebei-Shanxi border area), where he created woodcuts at the Eighth Army Headquarters with other graduates of the Lu Xun Woodcut Workers' Group.
