= Wuxi Museum =

Museum in Wuxi, China

Coordinates: 31.566506°N 120.264630°E

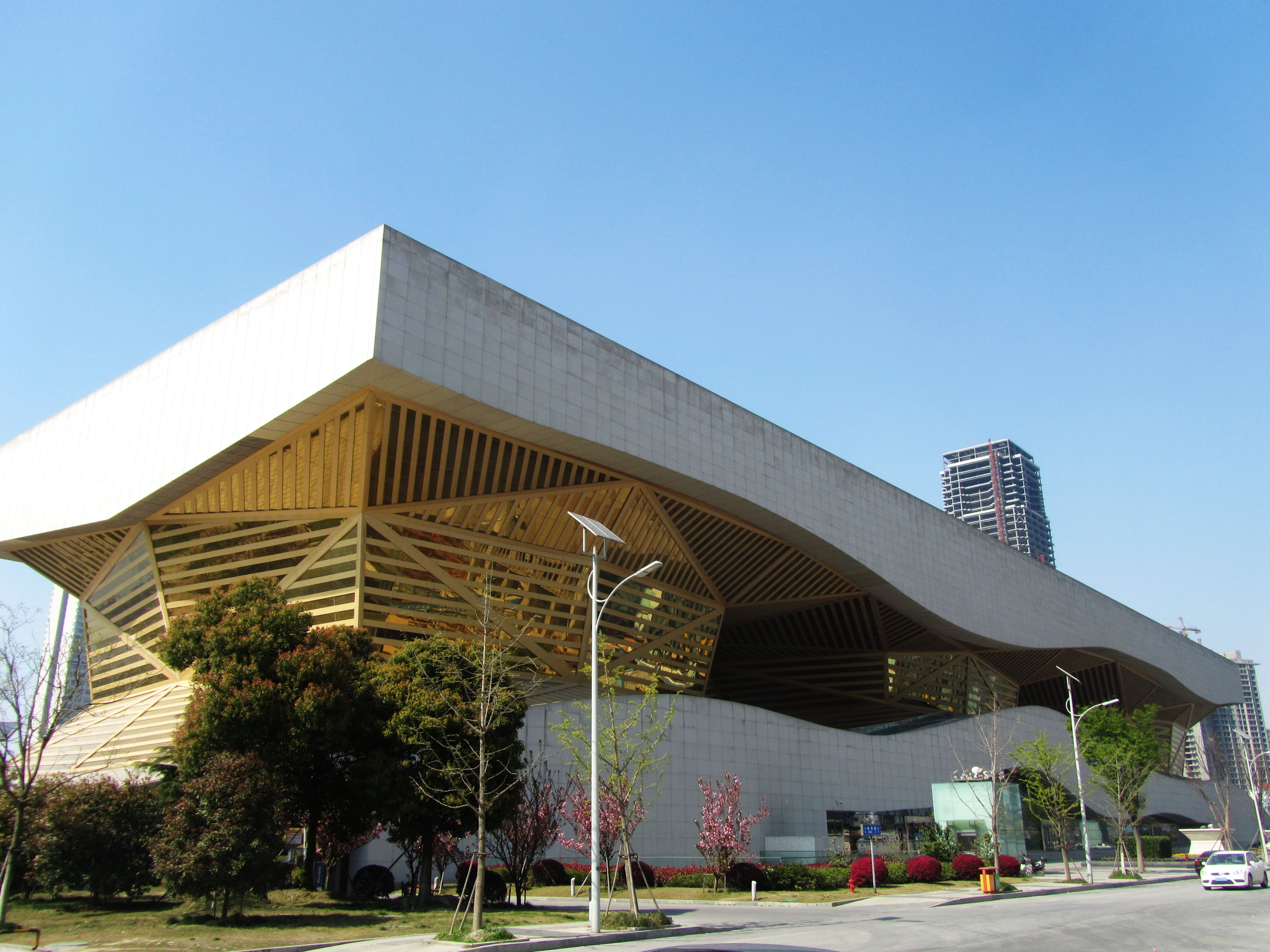
Wuxi Museum

The Wuxi Museum (Chinese: 无锡博物院) is a museum in Wuxi, Jiangsu, China. Its exhibits date back 6000 years and it has a notable collection of Qing dynasty cannons.

== See also ==
- List of tourist attractions in China
