= Xiao Zhuang (photographer) =

Chinese photographer (1933–2026)

- Born: 20 July 1932
- Died: 4 January 2026 (aged 93); Nanjing, China
- Style: Photography

Xiao Zhuang (晓庄; 20 July 1932 – 4 January 2026), previously named Zhuang Dongying (庄冬莺), was a Chinese photographer and photo editor.

== Life and career ==
Xiao Zhuang began her photographic career working as a photographer for the Lu Shui Newspaper of the No. 22 People's Liberation Army in 1950 and became a photojournalist for the Xinhua News Daily in 1952. She worked as the chief editor of the photography department of the Jiang Su Publishing Company from 1980, as well as for Light and Photography magazine. She retired in 1994 and became a consultant for the Chinese Photographers Association of Jiangsu Province. She documented the everyday life of Mao Zedong's China between the 1950s and 1970s. Her photographs are regarded as important resources in the field of Chinese studies.

In 2008, Xiao Zhuang was one of the very few female photographers featured in the landmark exhibition, Photography from China 1934-2008, hosted in Houston, Texas and commissioned by FotoFest. She was also included in group exhibitions such as Historical Retrospective Part I at the 798 Photo Gallery in 2011 and Grain to Pixel: A Story of Photography in China at Shanghai Center of Photography in 2015. The latter exhibition was curated by the noted British art critic and historian Karen Smith. It travelled to Australia, where it was shown as China: Grain to Pixel at the Monash Gallery of Art, Melbourne, in 2016. However, alongside six other works, Xiao Zhuang's The Irrational Times 39, Nanjing was prohibited from being exported by the Chinese government. Instead, the Australian version of the exhibition presented the censored photographs in its exhibition catalogue. Implementing a "patriotic" style, it was uncertain why the government decided to censor Xiao Zhuang's photograph.

Xiao Zhuang was included in edited books such as 100 Photographers Focus on China and China: Portrait of a Country. She also published photo books, such as The Red Albums: Photographic Notes of Xiao Zhuang (English and Chinese). The Red Albums contains her photographs from the 1950s to the 1970s.

Xiao died on 4 January 2026.
