= Ding Yu (painter) =

Chinese artist

Ding Yu (circa 1800), was a Chinese painter. She was married to the painter Zhang Pengnian (1761–1818) and was known for her portrait paintings in the Western style.
