= List of Chinese contemporary artists =

This is partial list of contemporary Chinese artists. This list is unlikely to be static.

== A ==
- Ai Weiwei

== B ==
- Bingyi (born 1975), painter

== C ==
- Chevalier li (born 1961) Painter, Installation. Chinese born French Artist
- Cai Jin (born 1965), painter
- Cang Xin
- Cao Fei (born 1978), multimedia artist
- Cao Yu (artist) (born 1988), visual artist
- Cao Hui
- Chang Ch'ung-ho or Zhang Chonghe (1914–2015), Chinese-American poet, painter, calligrapher
- Chen Guang
- Chen Ke
- Chen Man
- Chen, Movana (1975–present), paper knitting artist
- Chen Peiqiu (born 1922), the best-selling woman painter alive
- Chen Qiang
- Chen Shaoxiong
- Chen Shuxia
- Chen Wenbo
- Chow Chung-cheng (1908–1996), finger painter, writer
- Chow Chun Fai
- Chu Chung-shing (born 1958), sculptor

== D ==
- Ding Yi

== F ==
- Fu Yu

== G ==
- Gao Minglu
- Guan Zilan or Violet Kwan (1903–1986), avant-garde painter

== H ==
- Han Yajuan (born 1980), contemporary artist
- He Xiangning (1878–1972), feminist, politician, painter, poet*Hai Bo
- He Yunchang
- Huang Yan

== I ==
- Inri

== J ==
- Aowen Jin (active since 2010), Chinese-born British artist

== K ==
- Kan Xuan (born 1972), visual artist

== L ==
- Li Chevalier (born 1961) Painting; Installation Chinese born French artist ( 诗蓝 in Chinese)
- Li Shuang (born 1957), contemporary artist
- Liang Xiao Ping (born 1959), calligrapher, from 1987 resident in Australia
- Liao Jingwen (1923–2015), calligrapher and curator of the Xu Beihong Memorial Museum
- Li Di
- Li He
- Liu Xiaodong
- Liu Ye

== M ==
- Miao Xiaochun
- Michael Lin
- Mok Hing Ling

== P ==
- Peng Wei (born 1974), contemporary artist

== Q ==
- Qiu Deshu

== S ==
- Sakimichan (born 1991) digital painter
- Sun Duoci (1912–1975), painter
- Shen Shaomin
- Shi Jinsong

== T ==
- Fan Tchunpi (1898–1986), painter and ceramicist

== W ==
- Evan Siu Ping Wu (active since 2012), painter
- Wang Jianwei
- Wang Qingsong
- Wang Xin

== X ==
- Xiao Lu (born 1962), installation and video artist
- Xin Fengxia (1927–1998), pingju actress, painter, writer
- Xiang Jing
- Xinyi Cheng (born 1989), figurative painter
- Xu Jingyu

== Y ==
- Yijun Liao
- Ying Miao (born 1985), internet artist
- Yan Cong
- Yan Li (1954–2026), painter and poet
- Yan Xiaojing (active 2007–present)
- Yim Maukun
- Yuan Gong

== Z ==
- Zimei (active since 1999), multidisciplinary artist, musician
- Zhang Feng
- Zhang Jian-Jun (born 1955), multidisciplinary artist, curator
- Zhang Xiaogang
- Zhang Xiaotao
- Zhong Wei
- Zhou Chengzhou (born 1982), filmmaker and photographer
- Zhou Jin Hua
- Zhu Yiqing (born 1974)

== See also ==
- List of Chinese artists
