= Cao Yu (disambiguation) =

Cao Yu (1910–1996) was a Chinese playwright.

Cao Yu may also refer to:

- Cao Yu (artist) (born 1988), Chinese contemporary artist
- Cao Yu (cinematographer) (born 1974), Chinese cinematographer
- Cao Yu (Three Kingdoms) (died 278), prince of the state of Cao Wei

== See also ==
- Cao Yuan
- Cao Yue
