= Bingyi =

Chinese artist

- Born: Bingyi Huang; Beijing, China
- Known for: Painting

Bingyi (Chinese: 冰逸) is a Chinese artist, curator, scholar, architectural designer, cultural critic and activist.

== Education ==
Bingyi received her B.A. from Mount Holyoke College in 1998, her M. A. from Yale University in 2001 and a Doctorate in Art History from Yale University in 2005. Her dissertation entitled "Rereading Mawangdui, From Chu to Han" was ranked the sixth most read dissertation by ProQuest amongst 70,000 dissertations in 2006.

== Work ==
Bingyi is best known for her enormous-scale ink paintings in which she works, over months or years, with the environmental conditions of a specific site, to capture a reality-scaled record of the climatic and topological forces shaping a natural or urban landscape. She is also known for her "ink bomb" Shanshui paintings using forces such as helicopters. She is one of the most provocative painters within the shanshui tradition yet manages to also work in different media and domains such as urban planning, film-making, poetry-writing and multi-media installations. At the other end of her wide-ranging practice, Bingyi explores the microscopic origins of organic life in intimate, small-format paintings, in which her minute and meticulous brushwork paradoxically reveals a profoundly creative, gestural, and "calligraphically expressive" quality drawn from her daily calligraphy routine. Through her hypnotic, obsessive endurance, and execution both painstaking and nuanced, one senses the loving power of nature itself as it crafts animate life from inanimate matter. Her work has been described by critic Jonathan Goodman as "epic" in scale. After working as an archeologist and art historian, Bingyi began showing her paintings in 2007. Bingyi's first large ink painting installation, 18 by 23 meters, opened at Chicago's Smart Museum of Art in 2011, in an exhibition curated by Wu Hung. He described the work as "arguably the largest ink painting ever made, the artist expresses a communion with both nature and traditions. Situated in the discourse on today's artistic practice, this is truly a work of contemporary art, which employs traditional Chinese aesthetics to enrich the definition and language of contemporary artistic expressions."

In October 2013, Bingyi occupied the center of Toronto's city hall to create an 1,800-square-meter ink painting over the course of a twelve-hour outdoor public performance entitled Metamorphosis: To the Non-earthlings. Less than three months later, she created Epoché, an immense public performance and installation at the Shenzhen Bao'an International Airport. Nicknamed "ink bomb," Epoché became an internet sensation. Working with the conditions of suspension, gravity, land, and wind, she bombarded an airfield with 20-kilogram (44 lb) oil-and-ink "bombs"—500 kilograms of material in total—launched from a helicopter. The resulting monumental canvas, a record of the performance and event, was installed at the center of the airport. In early 2014 Bingyi created an 18 by 22 meter ink painting/installation work entitled Wanwu. Wanwu is the most impressive in Bingyi's series of land and weather works. Made in Jiangxi Province's Longhu mountains, one of the most sacred sites in China, the painting registers the effects of wind, sun, humidity, air pressure, and terrain with ink and water on bespoke xuan paper. Installed again in a different manner for the Encounters public program of Art Basel Hong Kong 2016, Wanwu was a highlight of the art fair and was centrally featured in a variety of media outlets, including being selected as one of the top fifteen booths by Artsy.

In 2018, Bingyi re-created an ink waterfall at Emei mountain. The 200-meter-long painting descended from the top of the mountain and ran down the watercourse where the original waterfall had ceased to flow. The Emei Ink Waterfall became the central installation of Bingyi's 2018 solo exhibition "The Impossible Landscapes" at the Ink Studio in Beijing.

In 2019, Bingyi created "The Time Tower" in the city of Nanjing. The "Time Tower" is a 15-meter-high tower-shaped showpiece consisting of 28 huge screens constructed at the city of Nanjing. Various digital images and videos were projected onto the 28 screens, offering unique sensory experiences for visitors. Bingyi named "The Time Tower" a "light architecture", which combines spatial and sensory experiences into the beauty of information flow. On the same day, Bingyi opened her 1000-meter installation in Shenzhen, entitled "The Skin of the Ocean".

Bingyi is also known for launching the Lizard Institute in Beijing, which focuses on the research and nurturing of creativity. She has offered free education to students from top institutions internationally. Caixin Magazine journalist Li Hong describes Bingyi as "A New Kind of Modern Arts Educator" for her efforts and commitment to alternative education and research. The curriculum was designed to engage students in critical and creative thinking through studies of different perspectives through the eyes of artists, arts critics, and professionals whose work is related to critical and creative thinking, such as experts working in art, dance, filmmaking and media.

Since 2015, Bingyi has concentrated on a film project documenting the disappearance of Beijing's hutongs. Her narrative film trilogy Ruins will premier at the Los Angeles County Museum of Art.

Bingyi's artwork has been exhibited in Australia, Belgium, Canada, China, Germany, South Korea, Spain, Turkey, and the United States. Her work was included in the 7th Gwangju Biennale.

In 2020, Bingyi launched her "Grand Song and Sacred Temple" projects in Xiuwu, Henan province. This project includes her grand installation, concert in Taihang Mountains, her grand ink painting installation inside of the famous Reception Hall at Philadelphia Museum of Art, her performance entitled "Calling the Soul: the Taihang Rhapsody" at PMA and her poetic documentary film entitled 2020. Bingyi's revival of Song Shanshui paintings has been perceived as the most grandiose and most cross-culture/medium of her generation.

== Films with material about Bingyi ==
- The Enduring Passion for Ink (2013) by Britta Erickson
- She Turned a Yuan Temple into Her Home (2015) by Yitiao App
- Meet the artists | Bingyi (2024) by Art Basel

== See also ==
- List of Chinese contemporary artists
