= Wu Hung =

Chinese-American art historian (born 1945)

- Born: 1945 (age 80–81); Leshan, China
- Education: Harvard University (PhD)
- Parent(s): Wu Baosan; Sun Jiaxiu

Wu Hung (Chinese: 巫鸿; pinyin: Wū Hóng; born 1945) is an art historian and Harrie A. Vanderstappen Distinguished Service Professor of Art History and the College at the University of Chicago. He has also taught at Harvard University and worked as an adjunct faculty curator at the Smart Museum of Art. He currently serves as the director of the Center for the Art of East Asia at the University of Chicago.

== Early life and education ==
Wu Hung was born in Leshan, Sichuan China in 1945. His father, Wu Baosan, a renowned Chinese economist, met his mother, Sun Jiaxiu, a specialist in Western drama studies, when they were studying in the United States in the 1930s. After the founding of the People’s Republic of China, Wu and his parents moved to Beijing, where his father worked as the Deputy Director of the Institute of Economics at the Chinese Academy of Sciences and where his mother taught at the Central Academy of Drama. In 1963, Wu was admitted to the Central Academy of Fine Arts to study art history in Beijing, but his studies were soon put to a halt during the Cultural Revolution. After a few years of “reeducation” at Xuanhua, Hebei, he returned to Beijing and worked in the Palace Museum for seven years, first in the Department of Painting and Calligraphy and then in the Department of Bronze and Stone Carving. He returned to the Central Academy of Fine Arts in 1978 to pursue a Master’s degree and graduated in 1980. At the same year, he went to study at Harvard University under the supervision of the eminent archaeologist Kwang-chih Chang. He received his PhD in fine arts and anthropology in 1987 from Harvard.

== Career ==
In the year of receiving his doctorate, Wu was hired by the Department of Fine Arts of Harvard as an assistant professor. In 1990, he was appointed as the John L. Loeb Associate Professor of the Humanities at Harvard.

In 1994, Wu was named as the Harrie A. Vanderstappen Distinguished Service Professor in Chinese Art History by the University of Chicago. In addition to teaching and research at the University of Chicago, he established the Center for the Art of East Asia in 2003, which has become an internationally renowned academic center dedicated to the study of East Asian art and visual culture. Wu was elected a member of the American Academy of Arts and Sciences in 2007. From 2015 to 2016, he was the Slade Professor of Fine Art at the University of Oxford and gave the 2016 Slade Lecture. In 2019, he delivered the 68th A. W. Mellon Lectures at the National Gallery of Art. He also organized many important symposia on topics of Chinese and East Asian art, including Between Han and Tang: Religious Art and Archaeology of a Transformative Period in 1998–2001, Reinventing the Past: Antiquarianism in East Asian Art and Visual Culture in 2006, and the biennial International Conference on Ancient Tomb Art between 2009–2019.

Wu is also active in curating exhibitions on contemporary Chinese art at venues in both the US and China. Major exhibitions he curated include The Allure of Matter: Material Art from China (2019), Between Past and Future: New Photography and Video from China (2004), Tui-Transfiguration: The Image-World of Rong Rong and Inri (2003), and Transience: Experimental Chinese Art at the End of 20th Century (1999), among others.

Wu has served as the Adjunct Faculty Curator at the Smart Museum of Art at the University of Chicago from 2018 to 2023, and he has also served on the steering committees of art institutions in China including Three Shadows Contemporary Photography Gallery, OCAT Beijing, and the Yuz Museum Shanghai.

== Scholarly work ==
Wu Hung’s scholarly works on Chinese art center around a broad range of topics and themes. One critical question on which Wu constantly reflected is what an artwork in Chinese art is and how it could be studied. Different from previous scholarship that focused either on iconographical identification or larger social trends, his dissertation and the first book on the Wu Liang Shrine of the Eastern Han dynasty treated the shrine as an integral object of analysis and revealed the visual logic behind its overall architectural and pictorial program. In a similar vein, his later case studies on individual tombs, such as Mawangdui tomb no. 1, and Buddhist caves, such as Mogao Cave 323, understood the works of art found in these sites within their original context.

Another major theme in Chinese art of which Wu pioneered the study is ritual art. His extensive work on liqi (ritual vessels) and other forms of art associated with rituals filled in the gap that long existed in the American academia that had centered around either the ancient bronzes of the Three Dynasties or the scroll paintings from later dynasties. His book, Monumentality in Early Chinese Art and Architecture, explained ritual art in various dimensions, from vessels to architecture and city design. Noticing the rich archaeological materials from and the unparalleled significance of premodern tombs in China, he proposed in the 2000s the establishment of funerary art as a subfield in the study of Chinese art history and as a subcategory under the broader frame of ritual art.

Wu’s contributions to the field of Chinese religious art included his discussion of auspicious images and the visual technology of wei (position) in representing invisible deities and souls. His studies also paid keen attention to the unique visual and spatial logic behind religious artmaking, as exemplified in his study of Buddhist bianxiang (transformation tableaux) paintings at the Mogao Caves, Dunhuang. Recently, he proposed a spatial approach to understand the murals and individual caves of the Mogao Caves as well as the site itself, adding a unique art-historical perspective to the existing archaeological and historical scholarship surrounding this major heritage site.

Throughout his academic inquiry, Wu has been consistently reflecting on the writing of Chinese art history, especially painting history. His monograph, The Double Screen: Medium and Representation in Chinese Painting (1996), was an intentional response to both the Chinese and the Western discourses on painting. His more recent works traced the representation of ruins in Chinese visual culture, considered the large corpus of paintings that represent female subjects, and critically examined the dominant mode of narrating Chinese art under the dynastic frame, all opening up new paths for writing Chinese art history.

More recently, Wu reflected on the studies of global art in a series of lectures and publications. In Ancient Chinese Art in Global Contexts (2017, in Chinese), he defined the unique contributions of traditional Chinese art in the global context from four art forms—ritual vessels, tomb art, handscroll, and shanshui landscape paintings. The Full-Length Mirror: A Global Visual History (2022) is another significant work among others that uses full-length mirror as a point of entry to tell a new kind of global art history.

Alongside his scholarship on ancient and premodern art, Wu Hung maintained a strong interest in the art of his own time and a commitment to expanding research on Chinese art from the contemporary period. As a graduate student at Harvard University, Wu curated several exhibitions at the Adams House art gallery featuring the work of painters from China including Chen Danqing, Mu Xin, Weng Rulan, Zhang Jianjun, Luo Zhongli, Zhang Hongtu, and others active during this time.

Beginning in the 1990s while teaching at the University of Chicago, Wu’s interest in contemporary Chinese art developed into a significant avenue of research centered on the development of what he called “experimental art” in China. Exhibitions Wu curated from the late 1990s onwards were the product of extensive field research and were developed with the publication of scholarly catalogues that have been instrumental to the emergent subfield of contemporary Chinese art.

The 1999 exhibition Transience: Chinese Experimental Art at the End of the Twentieth Century at the Smart Museum at the University of Chicago featured a catalogue of case studies on the twenty-two artists exhibited in the show. The exhibition explored several key themes such as ruins, memory, self-representation, urban space, and temporality that would be central to Wu’s understanding of contemporary Chinese art. The following year Wu curated the exhibition Cancelled: Exhibiting Experimental Art in China also at the Smart Museum. The show examined the landscape of exhibition-making in contemporary China, including the existing infrastructure of venues and methods of exhibiting contemporary art, and highlighted twelve innovative exhibitions that experimented artistically with the conventions of an art exhibition. The published catalogue featured translated archival materials and interviews with artists and curators. Other major research-based exhibitions include Reinterpretation: A Decade of Experimental Chinese art: 1990-2000 (2002); RongRong & inri: Tui-Transfiguration (2003); Between Past and Future: New Photography and Video from China (2004); Displacement: The Three Gorges Dam and Contemporary Chinese Art (2008); The Allure of Matter: Material Art from China (2019).

In addition to his research-based curatorial work, Wu has led several projects to identify and translate key archival documents pertaining to the development of contemporary Chinese art. These include the edited volumes Chinese Art at the Crossroads: Between Past and Future, Between East and West (2001) and Contemporary Chinese art: Primary Documents (2010). The latter served as a companion volume to Contemporary Chinese Art: A History (2014), a survey-length historical overview of contemporary Chinese art outlining Wu’s broad approach to the study of this subfield.

== Selected honors and awards ==
- College Art Association 2022 Distinguished Lifetime Achievement Award for Writing on Art, 2022
- Harvard University Honorary Doctorate Degree in Arts, 2019
- A. W. Mellon Lectures in the Fine Arts, National Gallery, 2019
- College Art Association distinguished scholar, 2018
- Slade Professorship, University of Oxford, England, 2016
- The 2015 Guanghua Distinguished Scholar of Humanities, Fudan University, Shanghai, 2015
- Kirk Varnedoe Professorship, Institute of Fine Arts, NYU, 2011–2012
- Elected member, American Philosophical Society, 2012
- Distinguished Teaching Award, College Art Association, 2008
- Elected member, American Academy of Art and Science, 2007
- Monumentality in Early Chinese Art and Architecture is listed as one of “The Best Books of the 1990s” in Artforum, 1999
- The Wu Liang Shrine: The Ideology of Early Chinese Pictorial Art wins the Joseph Levenson Prize for the best book in Chinese studies (traditional), Association for Asian Studies, 1990

== Selected books in English ==
Premodern

- The Wu Liang Shrine: The Ideology of Early Chinese Pictorial Art. Stanford: Stanford University Press, 1989
- Monumentality in Early Chinese Art and Architecture. Stanford: Stanford University Press, 1995
- The Double Screen: Medium and Representation in Chinese Painting. London and Chicago: Reaktion Books and University of Chicago Press, 1996
- 3000 Years of Chinese Painting. New Haven and Beijing: Yale University Press and China Foreign Languages Press, 1997 (co-author)
- Chinese Sculpture. New Haven and Beijing: Yale University Press and China Foreign Languages Press, 2006 (co-author)
- Art of the Yellow Spring: Rethinking Chinese Tombs. London and Honolulu: Reaktion Books and Hawaii University Press, 2010
- A Story of Ruins: Presence and Absence in Chinese Art and Visual Culture. London and Princeton: Reaktion Books and Princeton University Press, 2012
- Space in Art History. Shanghai: Shanghai renmin chubanshe (bilingual in Chinese and English), 2017
- Chinese Art and Dynastic Time. Princeton: Princeton University Press, 2022
- The Full-length Mirror: A Global Visual History. London: Reaktion Books, 2023
- Spatial Dunhuang: Experiencing the Mogao Caves. Seattle: University of Washington Press, 2023

Modern & contemporary

- Transience: Chinese Experimental Art at the End of the 20th Century. Chicago: Smart Museum of Art, University of Chicago, 1999
- Exhibiting Experimental Art in China. Chicago: Smart Museum of Art, the University of Chicago, 2000
- Reinterpretation: A Decade of Experimental Chinese Art (1990-2000), The First Guangzhou Triennial. Guangzhou: Guangdong Museum of Art, 2002 (chief editor)
- Rong Rong’s East Village. New York: Chambers Fine Arts, 2003
- Remaking Beijing: Tiananmen Square and the Creation of Political Space. London and Chicago: Reaktion Books and University of Chicago Press, 2005
- Displacement: The Three Gorges Dam and Contemporary Chinese Art. Chicago: Smart Museum of Art, 2008
- Between Past and Future: New Photography and Video from China. Chicago and New York: Smart Museum of Art and International Center of Photography, 2004 (co-author)
- Making History: Wu Hung on Contemporary Chinese Art, Hong Kong: Timezone 8, 2009
- Waste Not: Zhao Xiangyuan and Song Dong. Tokyo: Tokyo Gallery, 2009 (author and editor)
- Wu Hung on Contemporary Chinese Artists, Hong Kong: Timezone 8, 2009
- Contemporary Chinese Art: A History. London: Themes & Hudson, 2014
- Contemporary Chinese Art: Primary Documents. New York: MoMA publication, 2010 (editor)
- Zooming In: Histories of Photography in China. London: Reaktion Books, 2016
- Allure of the Matter: Material Art from China. Chicago: Smart Museum of Art, 2019 (co-editor)
