= Zhou Jin Hua =

Chinese painter (born 1978)

Zhou Jin Hua (born 1978) is a Chinese painter.

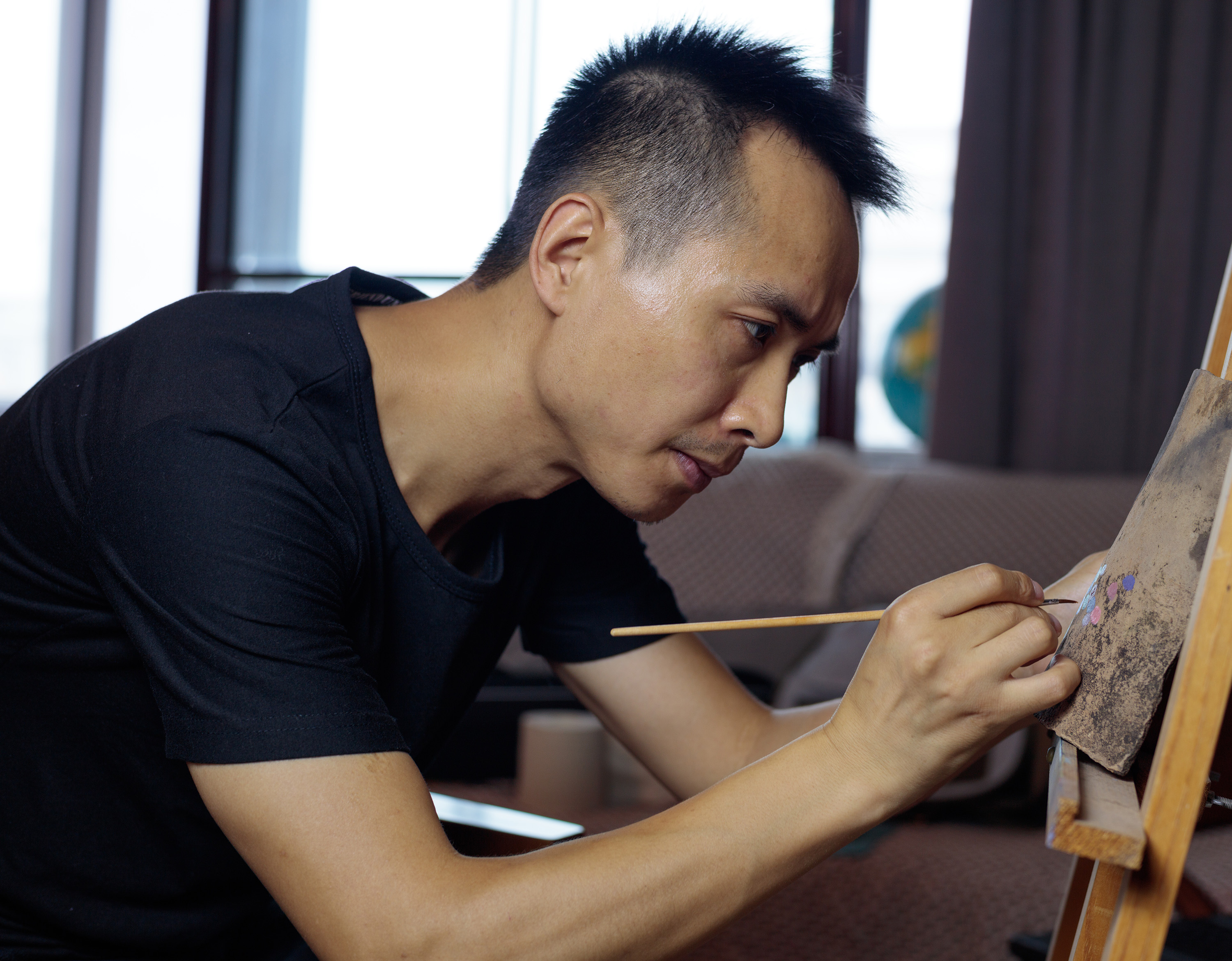
Zhou Jin Hua

== Biography ==
He was born in Deyang, Sichuan Province in 1978, and he graduated from the Department of Oil Painting of Sichuan Fine Arts Institute in 2002.

He is an artist who is currently working and living in Beijing and Chongqing. His art was placed in the National Art Museum of China in Beijing (CN), Kunstverein Konstanz (GER) .

== Collections and awards ==
His works have been collected by numerous private Western and Chinese art collections:

- "What a Big Crevice, 2007", collected in Guangdong Museum of Art
- "Dinner under the Sunset, The Results are the Same in the End No. 5, 2008" collected in Yuz Museum, Indonesia.
- "Golden Age No. 9, 2008" collected in White Rabbit Gallery in Australia.
- "Amitabha Buddha" and "Glory No. 2, 2012" collected and long exhibited in University of Mannheim in Germany.
- "Flame series No.6 and No. 7, 2006" won the Recommendation Award at the 2006 Shanghai Art Fair Young Artists Works Exhibition.
- "After Wind and Rain, 2007" won 2007 Hong Kong LV Asian Art Prize
- "Infinite Scenery, 2010" won the First-Class Award at the Teachers' Category of the Second Art and Design Exhibition of Chinese Universities in 2010.

== Publications ==
- Young Chinese Artists; Christoph Noe et al.; Prestel; 2008

== See also ==
- List of Chinese contemporary artists
