= Zhu Yiqing =

Chinese artist

Zhu Yiqing (b. 1974 Nantong, Jiangsu Province) is a Chinese artist, based in Beijing. With artist Xue Yongjun, he formed an "artists group" and started to create and paint together.

== Early life ==
He was born in the 1970s when China was beginning economic reform and opening.

== Career ==
Zhu and Xue observed the influx of western cultures and capitalism. They noted the prevailing of Japanese cartoon culture as well as the significant influence of computers and the Internet. Those changes inspired them to study modern cultural collisions from the view of artists before choosing the traditional Chinese seal as their medium.

Zhu and Xue's creations mainly cover political images of flag and politician, cultural images of classical paintings both eastern and western as well as the popular and consumption cultural images of the idol stars and products logos.

Zhu and Xue explore duality in their selection of subjects, medium and skills and formal expression, trying to eliminate the boundaries between the east and the west, the native and the foreign, the traditional and the modern, the handmade and the machined as well as the perspective and the plane, thus balancing those conflict/contradictions and outlining the new image painting of digital era.

== Art Review ==
As China's traditional cultural symbol, the seal stands for social status and power, exactly showing Chinese values. This is why Zhu and Xue paint with seals: to respond to the collision of modern culture with the multiple meanings of seals from elementary language to status token. They stated, “We choose those representative ones and deconstruct them to present the pixelized features of computer age. The deconstruction endows the images with internal connections, making them carriers of the subjects that the artists require for the artworks. As the images have been reduced of its original meanings with the variation, they exist in status of collision, shatter, variation and melting.”

Given the concept of cultural collision, transforming the political flag and celebrities, classical paintings of culture and celebrities transformed into seals of cultural and commodity symbols, Zhu and Xue implant those vocabularies into the paintings, expressing resistance to foreign cultures. For example, their Made in China series built the totems of the two world powers of China and America from both real and illusionary perspectives. The Chinese banner with both Chairman Mao Zedong’s portrait and the five-star red flag – a Chinese flag together with capitalism brand signs in another painting, though of totally different subjects, satirize the current cultural problems of consumption, and reflect China's accommodation to capitalism.

Seals were invented to reproduce images in great number conveniently. However, Zhu and Xue cast off the convenient and simple nature of seals when painting with them, changing the effect from printing into painting with a complicated process. They carve the seals they use, and then overprint them on canvas one by one, different from Pop Art’s speed of duplication.

From plane surface to space, from characters to paintings, and from the images composition to illusions, the creation shows a new connection and balance between printing and painting, the plane and the perspective, as well as the machinery of duplication and handmade production. It also implicates the artists’ perceptual explanation during construction.

== Exhibitions ==
- 1997 Contemporary Art Exhibition in Liuhaisu Museum
- 1999 Solo Exhibition at Shanghai Yige Gallery
- 2004 Group Exhibition at Beijing National Art Camp
- 2005 Solo Exhibition at New Art Space Gallery
- 2008 Go China!--Chinese Contemporary Artists, Mountain Art Beijing & Frank Lin Art Center, Beijing
- 2008 Fragility of Duplication——Exhibition of Zhu Yiqing & Xue Yongjun, Mountain Art Beijing & Frank Lin Art Center,798 Beijing
- 2009 Art & Home, Group Show, Mountain Art Beijing & Frank Lin Art Center, Beijing
- 2010 Made in China——Exhibition of Zhu Yiqing & Xue Yongjun, Mountain Art Beijing & Frank Lin Art Center, 798
- 2011 Mapping Asia-Young Asian Artists Solo Shows, CIGE 2011, Beijing
- 2011 Made in China-New Chinese Contemporary Art Scene, National Dr. Sun Yat-sen Memorial Hall, Taipei
- 2011 Shanghai Contemporary 2011, Shanghai Exhibition Hall, Shanghai
- 2011 Made in China-New Chinese Contemporary Art Scene, Mountain Art Beijing & Frank Lin Art Center,798 Beijing
- 2011 Language of Flowers-Group Exhibition of Artist, Mountain Art Beijing & Frank Lin Art Center,798 Beijing
- 2012 Art Beijing 2012 National Agricultural Exhibition Center
- 2012 Globalization / Localization——Exhibition of Zhu Yiqing & Xue Yongjun, Mountain Art Beijing & Frank Lin Art Center,798 Beijing
