= Li Chevalier =

French artist

Li Chevalier 诗蓝
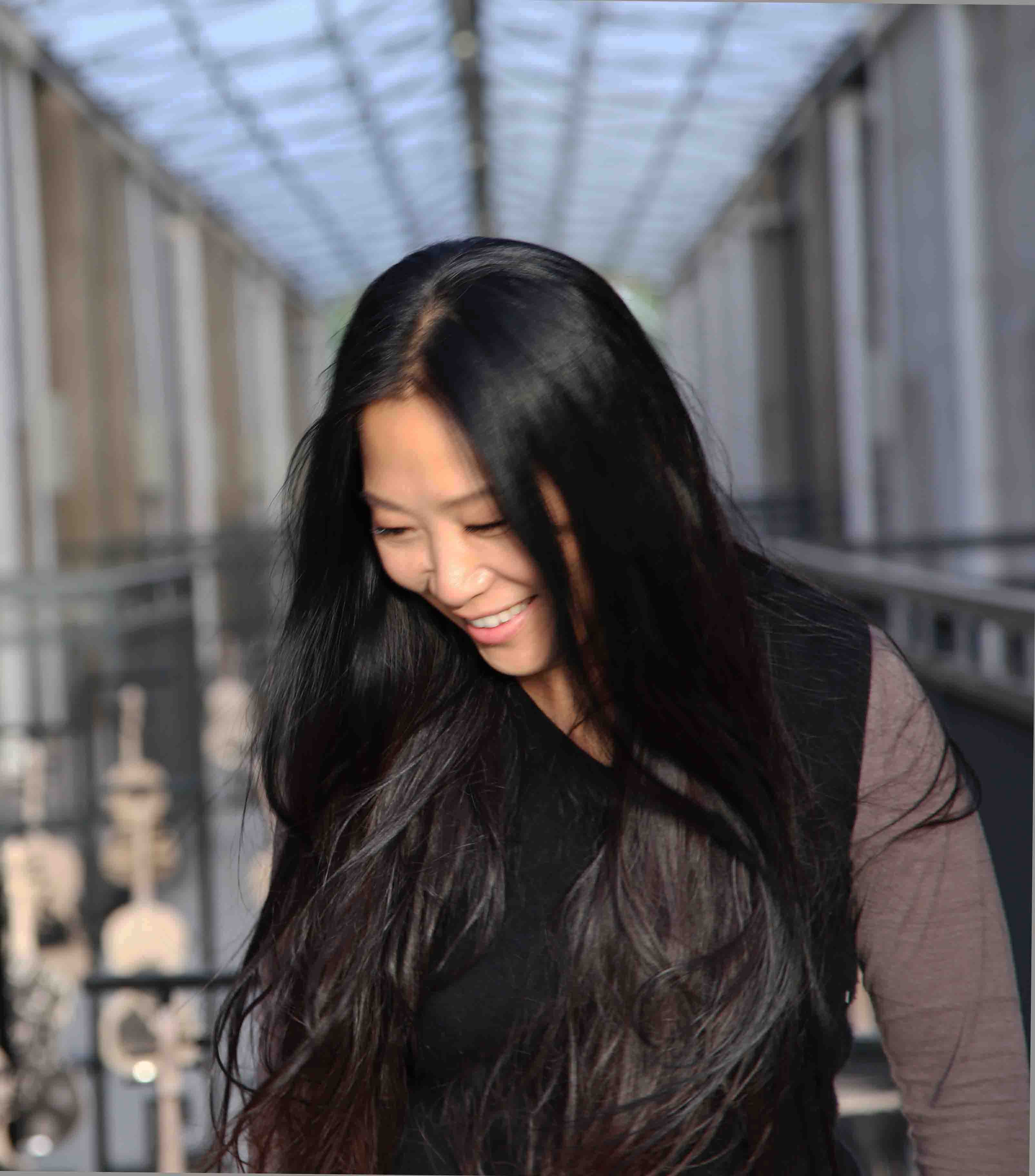
- Li Chevalier in 2013
- Born: March 30, 1961 (age 64); Beijing
- Education: Central St. Martins College of Art and Design, London.
- Website: www.lichevalier.com

Li Chevalier (Chinese: 诗蓝; pinyin: Shī Lán; born March 30, 1961) is a Chinese-born French painter, calligrapher and installation artist.

== Early life and education ==
Li Chevalier was born in the People's Republic of China. Recruited at the age of 15 by the Chinese Army as a singer, she was demobilized 5 years later. Li Chevalier left China in 1984 after the Anti Spiritual Pollution Campaign was launched by the government in 1983. She eventually became a French citizen in 1986. She embarked on studies in politics and philosophy in France. She has a degree from the Central St. Martins College of Art and Design, but also studied at the Paris Institute of Political Studies (1986–1990) and earned an M.A in philosophy at the Sorbonne University over the theme: A Human Screen - an inevitable political ethics. Li Chevalier understands that being both female and Asian can be extremely difficult in the world of contemporary art dominated by male artist and political discussion. However, she refused to compromise what she loves.

== Career ==
Chevalier embarked in Chinese art scene in 2008. She met the Chinese art theorist Peng Feng Director of the Chinese Pavilions at the 54e Venice Biennale, who curated artist's major exhibition in China and France. In early 90s, Li Chevalier returned to artistic instruction in the major European cities, Florence, Paris and London. She attended in France the master classes of French painters Rémy Aron, Thibaut de Reimpré and Pierre-Henry. She received her nomination at French National Fine Art Society (SNBA) in 2003.Li Chevalier went to London in 2003 to attend the Dali Studio at Central Saint Martins ‘College of Art and Design. She later enrolled in post graduate studies in fine art and received her degree in 2007.In December 2004, the US Virginia Common Wealth University School of Art in Qatar hosted a major solo exhibition for Chevalier presenting for the first time her experimental ink painting. Her work is submitted and exhibited at Royal Academy Summer exhibition in 2007.

Chevalier now works in both Beijing and France and is part of a movement of Chinese artists seeking to restore the Chinese tradition of appreciation for artistic beauty destroyed in the Cultural Revolution. She has exhibited her work at the National Art Museum of China (2010), at the former submarine base in Bordeaux (2014), at the Royal Academy Summer Exhibition in London (2015), and at the Museum of Contemporary Art of Rome (2017). She often works in ink on canvas; Polifonia is an installation that also includes violins.

== Art Style ==
Li Chevalier adores black and white, both in her artwork and clothing style. Her artworks are intended to make viewers reflect the artworks to their own life. Li Chevalier uses objects to express her feelings or ideas. She uses a cross, cello, empty chair, and a tombstone to express a sense of loneliness and emptiness.
