= Chu Chung-shing =

Hong Kong ivory sculptor

- Born: 1958 (age 66–67); Xinyi, Guangdong, China
- Occupation: Ivory sculptor

Chinese name
- Chinese: 朱忠盛
- Hanyu Pinyin: Zhū Zhōngshèng
- Yale Romanization: Jyū Jūng-sihng
- Jyutping: Zyu1 Zung1-sing6

Chu Chung-shing (朱忠盛; born 1958) is an ivory sculptor based in Hong Kong. He is the founder of Prestige Crafts, an art studio located on Hollywood Road in Hong Kong. Chu is known for his elaborate carvings made from mammoth tusks.

== Biography ==
Chu was born in Xinyi, Guangdong in 1958. He moved to Hong Kong at the age of 23 to work as an ivory sculpting apprentice. In 1989, after a ban on international elephant ivory trade, Chu began working on mammoth tusks supplied from Siberia. Three years later he opened his art studio, Prestige Crafts.

== Selected exhibitions ==
- 2010: World Expo
- 2012: Great Hall of the People
- 2013: Hong Kong Convention and Exhibition Centre
