= Xu Jingyu =

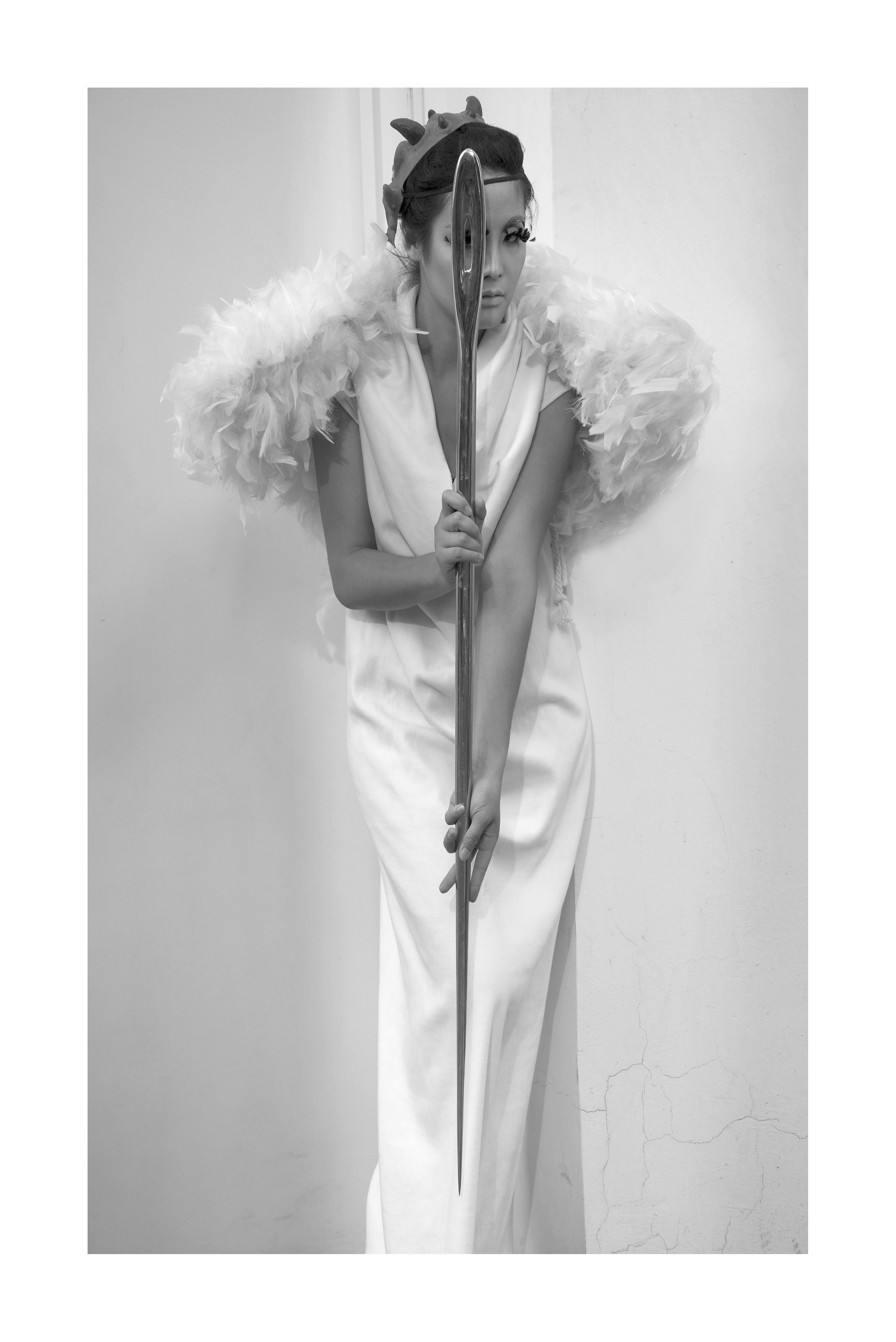

Xu Jingyu 许静宇 (born 1981) is a Chinese contemporary artist. Her work includes installation art, sculpture, photographs, paintings and performances. She is active in the field of contemporary art.

== Biography ==
Jingyu Xu was born in Shandong, China, in 1981. She studied sculpture at Shandong University of Art and Design and graduated in 2004. From 2004 to 2012, she taught at the School of Modern Handicraft at Shandong University of Art and Design. She resides in China and the United States of America.

In 2004, Jingyu Xu’s works won the bronze prize at the 10th National Fine Art Exhibition in China. In 2007, Jing went to the Ecole Nationale des Beaux-Arts de Lyon, where she was a visiting scholar. She was invited by the Hilger Gallery in Vienna, Austria, in 2012, to create and participate in the Chinese contemporary art exhibition "Shuffle" reloaded in Europe. In 2020, her short film won the Outstanding Work Award at the 1st Yage Literary and Art Award in the United States. Jingyu Xu’s works have been collected by art museums, institutions, and private collectors in China, France, Austria, Switzerland, and the United States. Jing regularly experiments with various art media such as sculpture, painting, installation art, photography, and video. Jing has held six solo exhibitions and more than fifty group exhibitions in China, Austria, the United States, and several other countries.

== Solo exhibitions ==
- Love with Art, Chinese Embassy in Paris, France, 2008.
- The Life! Art Gallery of Shandong University of Art and Design, Jinan, China. 2004.
