= Zhang Xiaotao =

Chinese painter (born 1970)

- Born: 1970 (age 55–56); Hechuan, Chongqing, China

Zhang Xiaotao (born 1970 in Hechuan, Chongqing, China), is a Chinese painter based in Beijing and Chengdu.

He graduated from the Oil Painting Department of Sichuan Academy of Fine Arts in 1996. He then became a teacher in the Southwest Jiaotong University, Chengdu from 1996 to 2009. In 2010, Xiaotao taught in the New Media Department of the Sichuan Fine Arts Institute. He now lives and works in Beijing and Chongqing.

Zhang makes paintings with sexual imagery often involving small animals such as frogs and snakes, and incorporating images of putrefaction and pollution.

His work Condom Series: Enlarged Props – Crystal And Fishes 2 sold for US$64,500 at Sotheby's Hong Kong in 2007.

== Near death experiences ==
When Xiaotao was seven, he visited the shore of the Yangtze River to play with his friends. His brother's friend pulled young Xiaotao into the current, just messing around, but soon lost control and had to swim ashore. Xiaotao remained out in the water and almost drowned before an adult who could brave the current came to his rescue. That tentative, struggling moment between life and death influences the artist's work expansively. His watery paint-strokes summon additional, related junctures of mortal existence: the point between conception and life, the limbo between death and afterlife, the suspension of time during coital climax. Xiaotao had an additional swimming accident, that too at the age of 7. Xiaotao now has frequently recurring dreams about drowning which, coupled with his accidents, most likely accounts for all the water imagery in his work.

== "Joyful Time" display ==
This display took place in Oakland, California at the Pacific Bridge Gallery.

Zhang Xiaotao's "A Joyful Time," displays huge oil and watercolor paintings inviting viewers into a bright underwater world of copulating frogs and intertwined human forms, the reaction "elated and free" may come to mind. In the display amphibious creatures float unencumbered in washes of blue, green, and orange paint, with their outlines making whimsical, eye-pleasing shapes. Perhaps this is a reflection of Xiaotao's background. Xiaotao nearly drowned as a child and is afraid of water and he comes from a country whose reproductive policies are heavy-handed and punitive.

In Zhang's opinion, oil paint is made to reflect the character of an ancient culture while embracing modern themes and colors. Fish, snakes, human faces, beer mugs, and condoms are repeating elements used by Xiaotao which appear in intricate layers of paint that defy opacity. The creatures' hues are often the blues and greens of the traditional Chinese pottery and carvings that can be found in jade markets, but placed in front of or behind the animals' outlines are shapes and symbols that would challenge, if not startle, any unsuspecting market regular.

In more than one painting, a pair of frogs hug blissfully, doggie-style. They are free-falling, not anchored to anything except each other-getting ready, perhaps, for their parachutes to open. On one canvas, they look skyward against a backdrop of floating clouds. On another surface, their background is a motif of human couplings taken from an ancient Chinese "pillow book" of how-to positions for adults.

The repetitiveness of the pillow-book images evokes pop art. Where Andy Warhol used a checkerboard of soup cans or Marilyn's head, here the repeated element is erotic: trios and couples in sexual play, sprinkled across the backdrop. From a distance, the canvas can look like a textile, such as a bed sheet.

While pop artists of the '50s and '60s were paying homage to postwar consumerism and icons of mass-production, China was still in the throes of the Cultural Revolution. But here Zhang turns to his artistic predecessors and, as if making up for lost time, incorporates their method. Even the vibrant sheen that some of his paintings seem to give off is reminiscent of silk screening, a mass-production technique that Warhol adopted in the early 1960s.

Some of the largest works, at the back of the gallery, are also the most provocative. In dark gray-green hazes float huge, rubbery shapes. They are transparent sheaths with reservoir tips, and faces peer from behind, or inside. Tiny bubbles are suspended within the wrinkled tubes, and here and there a splattered dollop of red paint contrasts with the green. The faces glisten as if behind a windowpane, and their wide-eyed constraint elicits sadness.

Everywhere in Zhang's work one finds splotches of the red paint. It appears to be mixed with something that won't quite blend with it, and the effect is that of a potato stamp made from a bumpy, many-eyed spud. In the context of sex and birth, though, these bubbles and deep-red blotches are semen and blood. They are the repeating threads of humanity: liquids that transmit life, inheritance, and the most essential fluids of ancestry-containing not only DNA, but also the ways in which we (both animals and humans) need each other and hurt each other. In their aqueous environment, the drops, smears, and splotches also remind one of amoebas seen under a microscope, like beads of a primordial sea.

The sensation of water is hard to shake. The oil paint itself has a liquid quality-it has been thinned enough to resemble watercolour from a short distance -and layered images often appear soaked, suspended, or dripped on. Zhang's frequently recurring dreams about drowning presumably account for all the water imagery in his work; his preoccupation stems from two swimming accidents when he was seven years old: one happened at the shore of the powerful Yangtze River, where he was playing with his companions. His brother's friend had pulled him into the current, teasingly, but soon lost control and had to swim ashore. Zhang remained out in the water and was almost dead before an adult who could brave the current came to his rescue. That tentative, struggling moment between life and death informs the artist's work expansively. His watery paint-strokes summon additional, related junctures of mortal existence: the point between conception and life, the limbo between death and afterlife, the suspension of time during coital climax.

If every one of Zhang's paintings, as he claims, is a glimpse into his dreams about drowning, then it would seem his nightmares have faded over time and produced aesthetic remnants. Yet new demons, universal ones, have popped out of his work while he processed his fears. The underwater trauma that transformed itself into beauty via paint and repetition reinvents itself here with new sociological and psychological overtones. Something new is displacing his original memories, overlaying passion upon experience, and revealing the intersection of childhood and adulthood.

== Awards ==
2012

- The Best Technology Award of Asian Youth Animation Contest 2012, Guiyang, China

2011

- The Best Technology Award of Asian Youth Animation Contest 2011, Guiyang, China

2010

- Nomination of Reshaping History: China Art 2000-2009, Beijing, China

2009

- Prize of Excellent Works of Chongqing Youth Art Biennial, Chongqing, China

2008

- Young Artists Award of 2nd Critics Annual Exhibition, Beijing, China

1996

- 1st Prize of Mei Yuan Cup, Lu Xun Academy of Fine Arts, Shenyang, China

== Solo exhibitions ==
2016

- Zhang Xiaotao: The Spring of Huangjueping, Pékin Fine Arts, Beijing, China

2014

- Worlds of the Trichiliocosm, Wilfrid Israel Asian Art Museum, Wilfrid, Israel
- In The Realm of Microcosmic, Pekin Fine Arts (Beijing), Beijing, China
- Plum Flower Patterns, white box art center, Beijing, China
- Empty Shadow, Jin Ji Hu art, Museum, Suzhou, China

2013

- Transition, Museum Of Contemporary Art Chengdu, Chengdu, China

2012

- Spiritual Encoding, Kuandu Museum of Fine Arts, Taipei, China

2011

- Sakya, White Box Museum of Art, Beijing, China

2010

- Epidemiology，Guangdong Museum of Art, Guangzhou, China

2008

- Microscopic Narration，Iberia Center for Contemporary Art, Beijing, China

2007

- Rebirth, Arthur M. Sackler Museum of Art and Archaeology of Beijing University, Beijing, China
- Desires without Limits, Dolores de Sierra Galería de Arte, Madrid, Spain
- Night, Shanghai e-Arts, Shanghai, China

2006

- Beautiful Imbroglio, He Xiangning Art Museum, Shenzhen, China

2005

- Dreamscapes, International Art Foundation 3.14 Bergen, Norway
- Dream Factory · Rubbish Heap, Tokyo Gallery, Japan
- Dreamscapes, M.K.Ciulionis Nat. Museum of Art, Kaunas, Lithuania

2004

- Dream Factory ﹒Rubbish Heap, Beijing Tokyo Art Projects, China

2003

- Materialistic Decay, Akie Aricchi Art Contemporary Gallery, Paris, France

2002

- Desire, Kunst Akademie Muenster, Germany

2001

- Zhang Xiaotao solo exhibition, Tokyo Gallery, Japan

2000

- Fabricated Images, Pacific Bridge Gallery, Oakland, U.S.A

== Group exhibitions ==
2015

- Point to Asia- 6th Moscow Biennale of Contemporary Art, Moscow, Russia
- Chinese Contemporary Art Invitational Exhibition 2015, Ming Yuan Art Gallery, Shanghai, China
- Chang Jiang International Image Biennale, Chang Jiang Art & Culture Club, Chongqing, China
- Asian Media Art Festival, Art Gallery of Chung-Ang University, Soul, Korea
- New Era – Created in China, Arhus Kunstmuseum, Aarhus, Denmark

2014

- Liquid Culture- China & Korea New Media Art Exhibition, Seoul Museum of Art, Seoul, Korea
- The Visible and The Invisible - Video and Photography from China Today, John and Mable Ringling Museum of Art in Florida, USA
- Echo – Multidimensional Traditions of Chinese Contemporary Art Exhibition, Hamburg Art Museum, Hamburg, Germany
- Translated Concussion—Chinese New Media Art Techniques and Practice since 2000, MOCA, Chengdu, China

2013

- China Pavilion at the 55th Venice Biennale, Arsenal, Venice, Italy
- Pure Views: New Painting from China, St. Monica Arts Center, Barcelona, Spain

2012

- Chinese animation since the 1930S，7th Asia Pacific Triennial of Contemporary Art, Queensland Art Gallery, :Queensland, Australia
- Holland International Animation Film Festival, Holland Animation Film Foundation, Amsterdam, the Netherlands
- Roaming the World—Zhang xiaotao and Pierre Exhibition, Chengdu Contemporary Art Museum, Chengdu, China
- Inward Gazes—Performance Art Documenta of China 2012, Macao Art Museum, Macao, China

2011

- Mountains and Rivers – Speechless Poem, Berne Art Museum, Berne, Switzerland
- New Age: Australia-China International New Media Arts Exhibition, QUT Art Museum，Australia
- Relationship: New Chinese Construction Art, Museum of Art for the XXI Century, Rome, Italy

2010

- Material and Code: Disciplinary Crossings of Cinema Studies and New Media, Chicago University, Chicago, USA
- Beijing Time, Santiago de Compostela, Santiago, Spain
- Heart—Forefront of Contemporary Architecture in China Exhibition, Vitra Design Museum, Weimar, Germany
- Arena: A Post Boom in Beijing, Hazelhurst Regional Gallery & Arts Centre, Hazelhurst, Australia
- The Big Bang, White Rabbit Museum, Sydney, Australia
- Pure Views: China New paintings, Louise Blouin Foundation, London, UK

2009

- Beijing Time, Casa Asia Matadero Madrid, Madrid, Spain
- Ink Not Ink—Chinese Contemporary Ink Painting Exhibition, Drexel University Art Museum, Philadelphia, USA
- Contemporary Art Rebirth of China, Palazzo Reale Museum, Milan, Italy

2008

- 55 Days in Valencia, Valencia Museum of Modern Art, Valencia, Spain
- Transgressive Body, TAPE Art Center, Berlin, Germany
- The Revolution Continues, Saatchi Gallery, London, UK
- Poetic Realism—A Reinterpretation to South of Yangtze River, Francisco Tomásy Valiente Art Center, Madrid, Spain

2007

- Starting From Southwest, Guangdong Art Museum, Guangzhou, China
- Chinese Whisper, Osage kwun tong, Hong Kong
- New Painting from Southwest China, K gallery, Chengdu, China
- From New Figurative image to New Painting, Tang Contemporary Art, Beijing, China 3 Langue 3 Colors, UM Gallery, Seoul, Korean
- 3rd Guiyang Art Biennale, Guiyang Art Museum, Guizhou, China
- The Art of Seduction—From Schiele to Warhol, Minoritenkloster Tulln, Austria

2006

- Jiang Hu, Jack Tilton Gallery, New York
- City Skin, Shenzhen Art Museum, Shenzhen
- Internal injuries, Marella arte contemporanea, Beijing
- Poetic Realism: A reinterpretation of Jiangnan, RCM Art Museum, Nanjing
- Enchanting Images of a Changing World, Vienna Essl Museum, Austria
- Unclear and Cleamess, Heyri Art Foundation, Korean
- The Road map of Painting 2, Beijing Tokyo Art Projects Beijing
- Varied Images, Shanghai art museum

2005

- China Contemporary painting, Fondazione Carisbo, Italy
- 2nd Prague Biennial, Prague, National Gallery Veletrzni Palac, Prague
- 2nd Triennial of Chinese Arts, Nanjing Art Museum Nanjing
- 2nd Chengdu Biennial, the Modern Art Museum, Chengdu
- Young Chinese Contemporary art, Hangar-7, Austria
- China Contemporary Painting, APalazzo Bricherasio, Torino, Italy

2004

- Forbidden Senses ? – Sensuality In Contemporary Chinese Art
- Espace Culturel François Mitterrand, Périgueux, France
- China Today Painting, Infeld-Haus der Kulturen, Vienna, Austria
- China's photographic painting, China Art seasons, Beijing
- Officina Asia, Galleria d’Arte Modema, Bologna, Italy
- New Perspectives in Chinese Painting, Marella arte contemporanea, Milano, Italy
- Artificial Happiness, RMIT Museum Melbourne, Australia
- Live in Chengdu, Shenzhen Art Museum, Shenzhen

2003

- left hand -right Hand, 798 Space Beijing
- Composite picture of Asian, Hong Kong Art Museum
- Image of image, Shenzhen Art Museum. Shenzhen
- Illusory, Museun63, Hong Kong. Guangdong art Museum
- links between two points, Tokyo gallery Japan

2002

- Dream, Chinese contemporary Art, CAC. Manchester
- Korean Contemporary Art Festival, Seoul Art Center, Korea
- Triennial of Chinese Arts, Guangzhou Art Museum
- Beijing Afloat, Beijing Tokyo Art Projects Beijing

2001

- Up-Down-Right-Left, -the Feminism etc., the Modern Art Museum, Chengdu
- Dream, Chinese contemporary art, Atlantic's Gallery, London
- Youth in transition, He xiangning Art Museum Shenzhen

2000

- Time of Reviving, 2000 Contemporary Art Exhibition of China, Upriver Gallery, Chengdu
- Between the Dreams and the Picturesque Meaning, Vienna Between 1900 And 2000, Schloss Cappenberg, Germany

1999

- '99 Academic Exhibition, Upriver Gallery, Chengdu, China

1997

- Urban Personality and Contemporary Art, Southwest Jiaotong University, Chengdu, China

1996

- Personal Experience Show, Art Museum of Sichuan Fine Arts Institute, Chongqing, China

== Selected exhibitions ==
2007

- Three Languages Three Colors, UM Gallery, Korea

2006

- Jiang Hu, Jack Tilton Gallery, New York, U.S.A.
- Unclear and Cleanness, Heyri Art Foundation, Korea
- Beautiful Imbroglio, He Xiang Ning Art Museum, Shenzhen, China (solo)

2005

- Dreamscapes, Foundation3, 14 Bergen, Norway (solo)
- Dream Factory - Rubbish heap, Tokyo Gallery, Japan (solo)
- 2nd Prague Biennial, Prague, National Gallery Veletrzni Palac, Prague, Czech Republic
- 2nd Triennial of Chinese Arts, Nanjing Art Museum, Nanjing, China

2004

- Officinal Asia, Galleria d’Arte Modema, Bologna, Italy
- New Perspectives in Chinese Painting, Marella arte contemporanea, Milan, Italy

2003

- Materialistic Decay, Gallery Akie Aricchi Art Contemporary, Paris, France (solo)

2002

- Desire, Kunstakademie Muenster, Germany (solo)
- Triennial of Chinese Arts, Guangzhou Art Museum, China

2001

- Flowers in the dream, Tokyo Gallery, Japan (solo)

2000

- Joyful Time, Gallery Akie Aricchi Art Contemporary, Paris, France (solo)
- Fabricated Images, Pacific Bridge Gallery, Oakland, U.S.A (solo)
- Joyful Time, Gallery Hartmann, Munich, Germany (solo)

== Individual pieces of work ==
- Xiaotao's painting titled "Enlarged prop - Bird," which is a dreamy looking painting of an emaciated looking bird attempting to feed or analyzing some sort of nest looking thing. Xiaotao emphasises lose detail here which invokes the dreamy feel. This painting is estimated to be priced around US$250,000.
- Another painting called "Fictioned Images No. 2" by Xiaotao, which is priced in the range of US$100,000, is a painting of a man looking through a glass mug. The glass mug distorts the man's face as he analyzes the glass. This painting also has Xiaotao's signature red splotches.
- Xiaotao's painting named "Crystal Condom" shows a yellow and a purple condom almost floating in the air in front of a blue background. This painting's price is estimated to be worth about US$85,000.
