= Mok Hing Ling =

Hong Kong artist

Mok Hing Ling (Chinese: 莫慶靈) is a contemporary Chinese artist known for her ink paintings. Her works explore themes of nature. Her work fuses several painting styles that combine conventional techniques with modern materials and brushstrokes. The majority of her works are landscapes.

In 1973, Mok settled in Hong Kong and started her art career. She concentrated on Chinese ink wash painting under Ding Yanyong in the 1970s, and later Cheung Kwan-sut. She has studied under Ting Hin-yong and Cheung Kwan-sut.

In 1981 and 1983, Mok participated in the Contemporary Hong Kong Art Biennial Exhibition. Additionally, her works were shown in other collaborative exhibits in Australia, Philippines, Japan, Taiwan, Malaysia, China, and Russia. During the 1990s, her solo exhibitions were held in Hong Kong and Canada.

Her paintings were selected in the 2nd Contemporary Chinese Landscape Painting Exhibition in 1993 and the 9th National Art Exhibition with a Showcase of Selected Works by Hong Kong, Macau and Taiwanese Artists. She received the third honor of "Youthful Artist in China" in 1994. Her paintings have also been collected by Taiwan Museum of Art, Jiangsu Provincial Art Museum, Hubei Provincial Museum of Art, He Xiangning Art Museum, and other investors. Mok was a member of the Hong Kong Modern Ink Painting Society until 2005.

Some of Mok's exhibited artworks are as follows:

Artworks	Year	Media	Size
Anchor a Boat 煙堵泊舟	1975	Ink & colour on paper	69x34cm
Mountain Scenery 野外	1983	Ink on paper	34x138.5 cm
Four Season 四季	1988	Ink on paper	125.5 x 60.7 cm
Deserted Mountain and Resilient Sun 山荒日麗	1988	Ink on paper	138x68cm
When Light Breaks 天際露顏	1991	Ink on paper	70x136.5 cm
After Rain 雨後山青	1993	Ink on paper	64x104cm
After Spring Rain 春雨後	1995	Ink & colour on paper	97x60cm
Autumnal Mountain 秋山	1997	Ink & colour on paper	102x62cm
A Range of Peaks 層巒疊嶂	1998	Ink & colour on paper	63.8x106.8 cm
Fall Season 落花季節	1999	Ink & colour on paper	64.5x64.5 cm
The Gloomy Clouds in Summer 夏日幽雲	2000	Ink & colour on paper	128x76cm
