= Zimei =

Chinese Artist and Musician

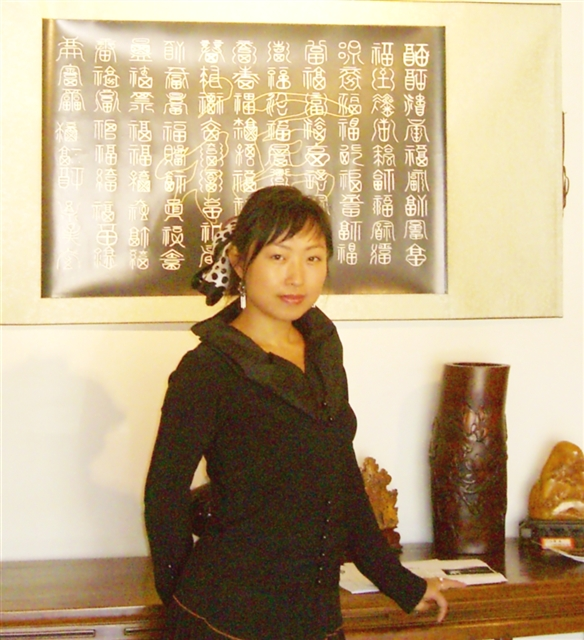
- Born: January 16, 1971 (age 55); Shenyang, Liaoning, China
- Known for: Art and Music
- Notable work: Artist
- Awards: Paper Carving and Its Craftwork

Zimei, (Chinese: 子媚; pinyin: Zǐmèi; born 16 January 1971), is a Chinese artist, musician, and author. She has won many awards and is involved in many artistic activities. Rich content in her art work includes traditional stories, landscapes, animals, folk architecture, and comprehensive pictures of Chinese traditional art and folk customs.

== Life ==
Zimei was born in a medical family, the third child in her family. Her grandfather was a famous doctor in Shenyang city of China in the 1930s, and her parents were doctors. Her family is also descended from a Bordered Yellow Banner aristocrat in Qing dynasty. Zimei grew up in Shenyang, the capital of Liaoning. She attended Shenyang University in China, where she studied business, and then College of Beijing, where she studied art image design. Zimei traveled to the United States, and held her art exhibition. After that she attended in the Sacramento City College to study art design and music. She immigrated to California as an "Extraordinary Ability" artist in 2010, and she has been introducing aspects of Chinese national art and culture to the local people at her art exhibitions and public events in the United States.

== Art work ==
Between 1999 and 2007 she lived in Beijing as an artist, and has had many solo exhibitions. She was also an executive manager in her early career.

Zimei was awarded the “Paper Carving and Its Craftwork” Chinese patent, which won a Gold Medal Award for best “Original Work” in the “International Asian Patent Exhibitions Fair” in 2002. Zimei received international acclaim for her art in the International Chinese Artists Society in 2007 the title “World Outstanding Chinese Artist”; her original art work was also awarded a special golden trophy.

== Music ==
Zimei is also a guzheng musician. She took lessons from the famous Chinese guzheng master Mr. Gao Liang when she was young. The guzheng is a plucked zither, and is one of the most ancient Chinese musical instruments according to the documents written in the Qin dynasty (before 206 BC). It dates back 2500 years, and has always been a great part of Chinese culture. Its voice is distinctive, soft and mellifluous. Zimei's performances such as “Fisherman's Serenade”, "The Autumn Moon Over the Han Palace", “The Elegant Moon”, “The Butterfly Lovers”, “Jasmine Flower”, and “Hometown Dreams” have impressed audiences. She performs masterpieces of Chinese music with not only her fingers but also her heart and graceful figure, mesmerizing the audience with her fingers that appear to prance.

== Other information ==
Zimei has been established mainly as a Chinese artist but is not limited to national artistic field in those genres. Her art is unique and modern. She has also published various articles such as “The Season of the Cherry Blossom”, “The Shiny Memory”, “My Mother” and “The Person's Search for One's Dream”, along with other articles in various Chinese newspapers.
