= Chen Shuxia =

Chinese contemporary artist

Chen Shuxia (Chinese: 陳淑霞, born in 1963, Wenzhou, Zhejiang, China), is a Chinese contemporary artist. Chen graduated from Central Academy of Fine Arts, Beijing (CAFA) with a degree in folk arts in 1987. She is currently an Associate Professor of Art Education Department at Central Academy of Fine Arts, Beijing, China.

Chen's work has been exhibited in several key galleries, including the Beijing Tokyo Art Projects and the Soka Art Center, Taipei. Chen's artwork has also been auctioned several times, with price ranging from eight thousand dollars to twenty-five thousand dollars.

In 2011, Vibration was sold at Ravenel, Taipei, marking the record price (25,120 US dollars) of Chen's artwork at auction.

== Exhibitions ==
=== Solo exhibitions ===
- 2009 "How Far Apart", He Xiangning Museum, Shenzhen, China
- 2006 "Virtual and Real" National Art Museum of China, Beijing
- 2005 "Primitive Colors" Sunshine Art, Hangzhou
- 2004 "Chen Shuxia Solo Exhibition", PYO Gallery, Seoul

=== Group exhibitions ===
- 2007 "Red Hills and Blue Water - Touring Exhibition of Works by Contemporary Sino-German Artists", Lubecker Art Gallery, Germany
- 2006 Vanity and Reality - Rediscovery of Asian Contemporary Art, Culture space of Seoul Heyri Art Fund, Seoul
- 2005 "Nature and Human - The 2nd Contemporary Chinese Oil Painting Landscape Exhibition", National Art Museum of China, Beijing
- 2003 "China New Physical Oil Painting Exhibition", Shanghai Liu Haisu Art Museum, Shanghai

== Award ==
In 1991, Chen's work Pink Flower won Silver Medal in the 1st China annual Oil Painting Exhibition in Hong Kong
