= Yim Maukun =

Chinese-Taiwanese artist, educator and author

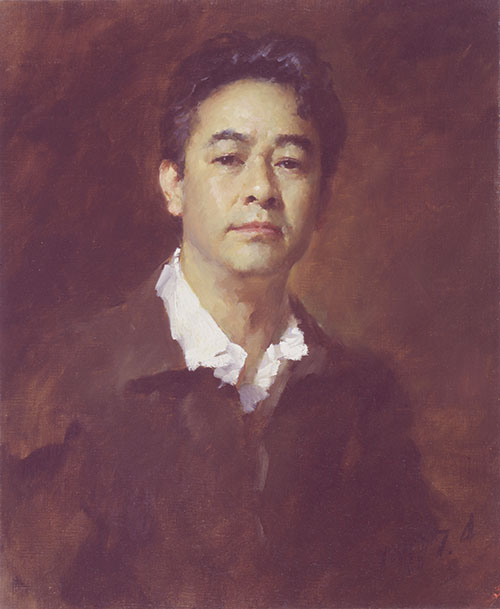
Self-Portrait, oil on canvas, 1987

Yim Maukun (冉茂芹, b. 1942, also known as "Ran Mao-qin" in Mandarin) is a Chinese artist, educator, and author, best known for his portraiture, nudes, historical/narrative works, and plein air landscapes. He works with a range of media, including oil painting, charcoal, ink, watercolor, and pastels. As part of his exhibits, Yim's work has been shown at two of the most important and prestigious museums in Taiwan, the Kaoshiung Chiang Kai-shek Cultural Center and the Sun Yat-sen Memorial Hall in Taipei (where he is also part of the permanent collection); he has been featured in dozens of publications, including Rachel Robin Wolf's recent Strokes of Genius: The Best of Drawing series published by North Light Books) and several of the more prominent art magazines and daily newspapers in China and Taiwan. Yim's instructional painting series has appeared on the Taiwanese networks China TV and Beautiful Life Television.

== Early life through the Cultural Revolution ==
Yim was born during World War II in Changde, Xiangxi, in Hunan province in south central China. Hunan had been invaded by the Japanese during the war, first in 1939 but only successfully in 1945 near the end of the conflict. As Mao Zedong's native province, Hunan had long been an active Communist area, including the site of a short-lived soviet in the early 1930s, but both sides of Yim's family consisted of members of the educated, property-owning (if not wealthy) class. Beyond that, Yim's father (Ran Peng 冉鵬) was a prominent official in the Nationalist government, as head of finance and transportation.

Upon Mao's revolutionary victory at the end of 1949/early 1950, Ran Peng left the country to join the exile government of Chiang Kai-shek (Jiang Jieshi) in Taiwan, leaving his wife and children behind in Hunan. According to the accounts, he did so still hoping to provide for them or to even soon bring them to the island, but this proved impossible (although for many years he was able to send letters and money to his wife through go-betweens in Hong Kong). Ran became head of the Department of Commerce under Chiang and was later general manager of the Hsinchu Glass Corporation and legal counsel to the government's Ministry of Economic Affairs. Yim would not see his father again.

Yim attended the Affiliated High School of the Guangzhou (Canton) Academy of Fine Arts and then the Academy itself, graduating in 1963. Because of his background as a member of one of the so-called "black classes", he had only been barely accepted as a student in the Affiliated School following the intervention of the Dean, Hu Yichuan; in fact, one of the "crimes" Hu would later be charged with during the Cultural Revolution was admitting Yim into the school. [For more on Hu Yichuan, see Julia F. Andrews, Painters and Politics in the People's Republic of China, 1949-1979 (University of California Press, 1995).]

While at the Arts academy, Yim was compelled to focus on "craft art", in his case specifically theater design. Craft Arts were seen as a more practical pursuit during a time of economic hardship for the country and also less tainted by Western influences; the other programs had been cut as part of the reforms overseen by Mao's wife, Jiang Qing. Following his graduation Yim served for fifteen years as the sole stage designer for a regional Guangdong theater repertory group—later "cultural worker troupe"—centered in Zhaoqing. The group was created as part of the 1960s equivalent of the Rectification Movement, charged with the task of bringing propaganda to the people. Yim's tasks included set design and backdrop scenery, and, as he recalls in his autobiography, "painting egg-sized Chairman Maos on projector slides."

During this time, Yim would in his free hours practice Chinese ink painting with his classmate and good friend Lin Fengsu. Many of the pieces were based on the Liao Zhai, a collection of Chinese ghost stories or on classics such as the Shijing (Book of Poetry).

Given his parentage and the extremely hostile attitude toward any "bourgeois" or "non-revolutionary" artistic pursuits during the Cultural Revolution, the decade was a tumultuous and often a personally very difficult period for Yim. This included time spent doing rural labor and mine work in a coal gang. Like many artists, intellectuals, and others, Yim was publicly shamed and beaten, humiliatingly paraded through the streets and denounced; his entire family faced severe discrimination because of their background. Amid the fervor and frenzy of the Red Guards, most of Yim's artwork from these years was destroyed in the name of anti-capitalist "permanent revolution."

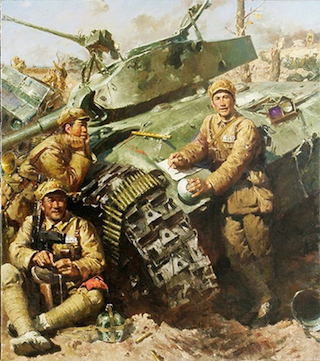
Warrior Song, oil on canvas, 1978

As the attitude towards art became slightly more relaxed with the first National Fine Arts Exhibition held in 1972, Yim was more able to pursue his own artistic interests and enter various regional and national competitions, all while still working for the troupe. He was enlisted by the Cultural Bureau on several occasions to participate in "provincial collective creativity sessions" throughout Guangdong, and by 1977 had earned sufficient favor from the regional cultural bureau to receive a grant to spend a month painting in Yuebei. By the mid-late 1970s, his paintings, with the pro-worker and heroic peasant motifs typical of the era (cf. Soviet Realism) and obligatory portraits of contemporary political leaders, had been featured in publications including Beijing Daily, Southern Daily, and Beijing Art. Yim gained major acclaim as the runner-up in the National Chinese Art Exhibition in 1975 for The Troupe Going Aboard. In 1978, his Warrior Song won first place at the Guangdong Province Art Exhibition. Additionally, Warrior Song was published in full color in Guangdong Arts and Literature, one of the few nationally distributed periodicals in China at the time. The famed artist and film director Chen Yifei was so impressed by the work that he invited Yim to dine with him at his home in Shanghai in 1979.

Yim at this point was also becoming more interested in themes related to ancient Chinese mythology, seen in pieces like Nuwa (1979) about the creator goddess of the same name, a subject he would return to in later works. Among the other significant works Yim completed during this span are the following: South Sea Waves (pastel on paper, 1974), Lingnan in February - Maan Coal Mine at Zhaoqing (pastel on paper, 1975), Sun Setting on Xijiang (pastel on paper, 1976), Maan Coal Miners (oil on canvas, 1977), Yao Farmers (oil on canvas, 1977), and Jiaona (ink on rice paper, 1979),

Two years after the death of his father, Yim was granted permission to move to Kowloon, Hong Kong, and then was able to visit Taiwan to help settle the estate. In Kowloon he would live in a cramped high rise apartment with his mother, younger brother, and fellow artist and friend, Li Changbo, who had all moved there earlier in the year. Yim had been married and a father since 1974, but his wife and young children were only gradually permitted to join him in Hong Kong and ultimately Taiwan one by one over the next several years, not fully reuniting until 1988.

== Hong Kong period ==
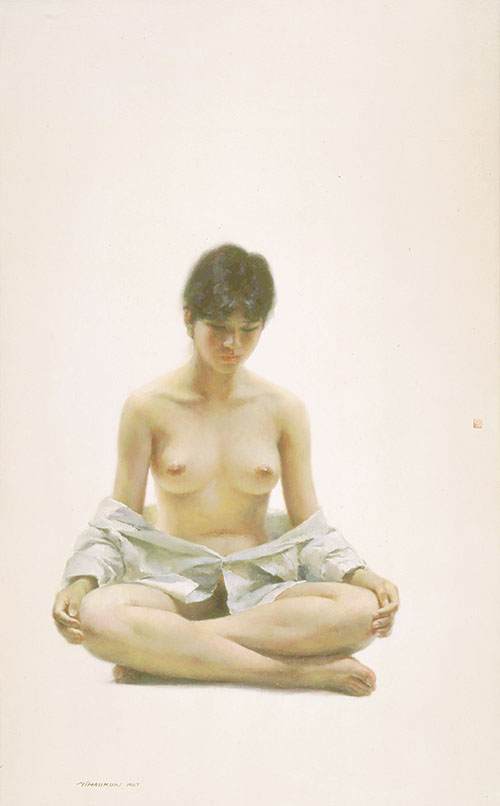
Untitled, oil on canvas, 1985

As he puts it, Yim arrived penniless in Hong Kong in 1980. He effectively was starting from scratch at age 38, leaving behind whatever reputation he had established in China as an artist for the previous fifteen years. He first earned income working on "export paintings" for art dealers. These consisted mainly of full-sized personal and family portraits made from small photos, replicas of classical European paintings, and reproductions of pieces from various international art magazines. While this can be considered more of a money-making trade than true art, it was nevertheless a crucial stage in Yim's career for refining his techniques. It led to an arrangement through the art dealer Xu Yaolin in 1981 for Yim to produce original works—two original oil paintings per month—for the Simic Gallery in Carmel-by-the-Sea, California, as an associate painter. Several noteworthy pieces were the result of this (including Eternal Devotion, My San Francisco and the original version of Sunset), but the arrangement ended prematurely when Yim's application for a travel visa to the U.S. was denied in 1982.

By this time Yim had realized the need for using real life models (he was not strictly speaking yet a figure artist) and for opening a proper studio. 1983 marked the beginning of the Yim Maukun Studio on Prince Edward Road in the Edward Mansion area of Kowloon, where he would further hone his craft and hold demonstrations and classes regularly until 1988. His figure drawing and oil painting students would later be among the most prominent members of the Hong Kong art community, both as artists and instructors, such as Poon Yeuk Fai 潘耀輝, Bacchus Tong 唐家宏, Chu Ka Ming 朱嘉明, and Deng Yi Nong 鄧亦農.

A list of Yim's important pieces from his Hong Kong years would include Eternal Devotion (oil on canvas, 1981); Yang Jufen (oil, 1982); Derek Adkins (oil on canvas, 1983); Hot Corn (oil on canvas, 1984); Doorman (oil on canvas, 1984); Night Life (oil on canvas, 1984); Florist (Charcoal on rice paper, 1984); Artist's Wife (oil on canvas, 1985); Lady in White (charcoal on canvas, 1987); Untitled (oil on canvas, 1987); and Christina (oil on canvas, 1987). His first solo exhibition was in 1985 at the Pau Siu Loong Gallery in Hong Kong.

== Taiwan ==
With the help of one of his father's good friends, Zhao Yaodong (head of the Ministry of Economics in Taiwan), by 1985 Yim had begun traveling regularly between Hong Kong and Taiwan for commissioned portraits; these trips became more frequent by 1986. This led to a very successful and highly publicized plein air portrait demonstration for the Apollo Gallery in Taipei in 1987 which generated positive attention from the city's newspapers and television stations. Lee Teng-hui, then Vice-President of Taiwan (and who would become President in 1988) saw the event on TV, was impressed and attended the exhibition that followed. All in all the demonstration proved to be a major boost to Yim's career, leading to a number of published works, including covers for Crown Magazine and the Far Eastern Economic Review that same year, and further portrait commissions of other prominent individuals from Taiwanese society. Yim's partnership with the Apollo gallery would continue into the 1990s, and Lee Teng-hui would remain one of his avid collectors and patrons. The Apollo demonstration was clearly a turning point in Yim's life as a professional artist.

The major works from these Taiwan years—all oil paintings—include Evening Spring Rain in Taipei (1990); Reaching Shore (Taiwan Forefather Series) (1995); Crossing the Stormy Strait (Taiwan Forefather Series) (1996); Mackay Practicing Medicine (1996); Autumn Harvest on the Plateau (1997); The Death of Concubine Yang (1999); Lady in Shimmering Light (2002); Alishan Forest (2002); Lady in Green (2003); Sakura (2005); Tanya (2006); Westside Evening (2010); Xuan Zang (2011); and Emperor Guangxu and Consort Zhen (2015).

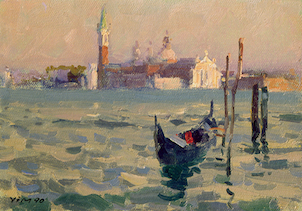
Venice, oil in canvas, 1990

== Travel ==
By 1988 Yim had moved to Taiwan permanently and his family would join him the following year. It was a prosperous time both for the island and for Yim as an artist, and this enabled travel to become a major element of his work and his lifestyle. The ensuing years would feature painting trips not only to Europe but throughout mainland China, New Zealand, the United States, and Japan, with remarkable output (sixty paintings during his 1990 trip to Western Europe alone) and exhibitions resulting from that work. He led a successful tour of twenty Taiwan art students to Russia in 2001. A 2009 workshop tour in the U.S. included the Scottsdale Artists' School (Arizona), Studio 2nd Street in Encinitas, CA, and the Steve Carpenter Art Center of Rochester, New York. One of his more recent overseas workshops was in Shenzhen, China, in 2014.

== Educator ==
Since his move to Taiwan, Yim's popularity as a teacher has grown and drawn him into more formal settings, along with continued studio instruction. From 1993-1996 he taught classes at the National Studio for the advanced art major students from the National Taiwan Normal University and Cultural University, and would also serve as Visiting Professor at Hunan Normal University of Arts and Science in 1997, Overseas Artist for the Guangdong Academy of Fine Arts, and Honorary President of the Changde College of Crafts and Fine Arts. In more of a public capacity, beginning in the early 2000s, Yim was an Advisor to the Kaohsiung City Art Promotion Association (KAPAarts). In 2003 Yim opened the Twin Bridge Studio in Taipei, and he has occasionally taught at private studios in Kaohsiung, Tainan, and elsewhere. At Twin Bridge, where Yim continues to conduct classes and demonstrations, students can receive instruction both in the basics and most advanced elements of figure drawing, oil painting, watercolors, pastels, focusing on classical bust study, portraits, still lifes, landscapes, and beyond. In March 2009 he held a three-day workshop for the New York Figure Study Guild.

When Yim conducted two demonstrations and workshops at Fu Hsing Kang College on drawing and oil painting portraits in 2010, these sessions were recorded as instructional videos for students. His instruction and step-by-step details about his process as an artist can also be found in the 13-DVD set, Oil Painting with Mau-Kun Yim (2011) and his assorted books and articles, such as The Pastel Journal, A Tale of Small Paintings, The Drawing Handbook, and How to Draw the Head [see the full publication list below].

Oil Painting with Mau-Kun Yim features a series of demonstrations of still lifes, bust portraits, figure painting, and plein air landscapes, interspersed with short lectures by Yim on art history and techniques, as well as his personal background, the creation of individual pieces from his own oeuvre, and his philosophy of art and aesthetics. In the videos as he paints he explains composition, perspective, blocking, color theory (what he calls "the language of colors"), brushstroke, texture, and the challenges posed by each media and genre. The introductory disc also includes testimonials from several students.

== Exhibitions ==
Yim has held at least thirteen solo exhibitions and has been a part of well over a dozen group shows. A list is below. He has also done numerous pieces, exhibitions, and demonstrations for charity.

• The Art of Mau-Kun Yim, Hong Kong Art Center (Hong Kong), 1985 [solo]

• A Trip to Southern Taiwan, East Gallery (Taipei), 1988 [solo]

• In Memory of Hunan, East Gallery (Taipei), 1989 [solo]

• The Splendor of Taiwan, East Gallery (Taipei), 1990 [solo]

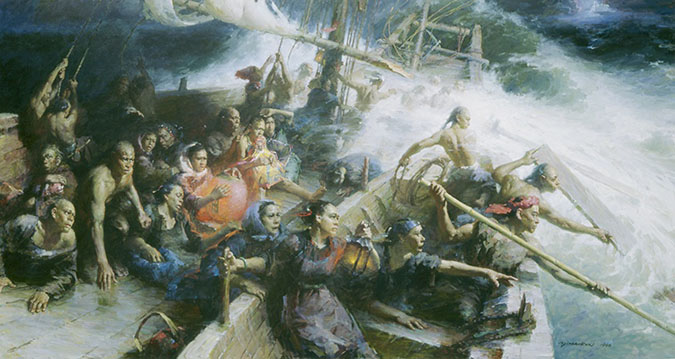
Crossing the Stormy Strait, oil on canvas, 1996

• Mini-Landscape Paintings of Europe, The Crown Cultural Center (Taipei), 1991 [solo]

• Pastoral Poetry of France, East Gallery (Taipei), 1991 [solo]

• The Art of Mau-Kun Yim, Astra Art Space (Taichung, Taiwan), 1994 [solo]

• The Art of Mau-Kun Yim, General Bank Art Gallery (Taipei), 1994 [solo]

• A Panorama of New Zealand, J.P. Art Center (Kaohsiung, Taiwan), 1994 [solo]

• In Retrospect: A Review of Paintings 1991 – 1993, East Gallery (Taipei), 1994 [solo]

• Exhibition at You Xiong Shi Gallery (Taipei), 1994

• Taipei Art Fair 1995 International, Exhibition Hall of World Trade Center (Taipei), 1995

• Taipei Art Fair 1996 International, Exhibition Hall of World Trade Center (Taipei), 1996

• Exhibition and speech at the School of Art at Hunan Normal University (Changsha, China), 1997 [solo]

• The Art of Mau-Kun Yim, National Chiang Kai-Shek Cultural Center (Kaohsiung, Taiwan), 2000 [solo]

• The Art of Mau-Kun Yim, Qing Shan Art Center (Taipei), 2001 [solo]

• The Art of Mau-Kun Yim, Sun Yet-Sen Memorial Hall (Taipei), 2001 [solo]

• Contemporary Masters, Cathay United Art Center (Taipei), 2004

• Mt. Jade Scenery, National History Museum (Taipei), 2004

• The Spirit and Character - Chinese Contemporary Realism oil Painting Exhibition, Academic Exhibition on Fifty Years of Chinese Realist Oil Paintings, National Art Museum of China (Beijing), 2006

• International Guild of Realism Exhibition, Manitou Galleries (Santa Fe), 2006

• Beijing Autumn oil Painting Exhibition, Shin Kong Place Art Center (Beijing), 2009

Taipei Art Fair 2009 International, Exhibition Hall of World Trade Center (Taipei), 2009

• Natural Beauty of Taiwan, National Taiwan Museum (Taipei), 2009

• Cathay United Art Center 10th Anniversary Exhibition, Cathay United Art Center (Taipei), 2010

• Watercolor of a Century – China Watercolor Art Research Exhibition, The National Art Museum of China (Beijing), 2015

== Competitions ==
In addition to the accolades already mentioned, Yim won First Place in the U.S. International Portrait Competition for Girl with Bronze Bracelet in 2005. That same year, Lady in Shimmering Light won both first prize at the international salon of Green House Gallery and the Cover Competition for The Artist's Magazine. The narrative painting Crossing the Stormy Strait, part of the Taiwan's Forefathers series, won the gold medal at the 2006 Beijing Art Expo [for more on Crossing the Stormy Strait, see "Historical and Narrative Works of Note" below].

== Portraits ==
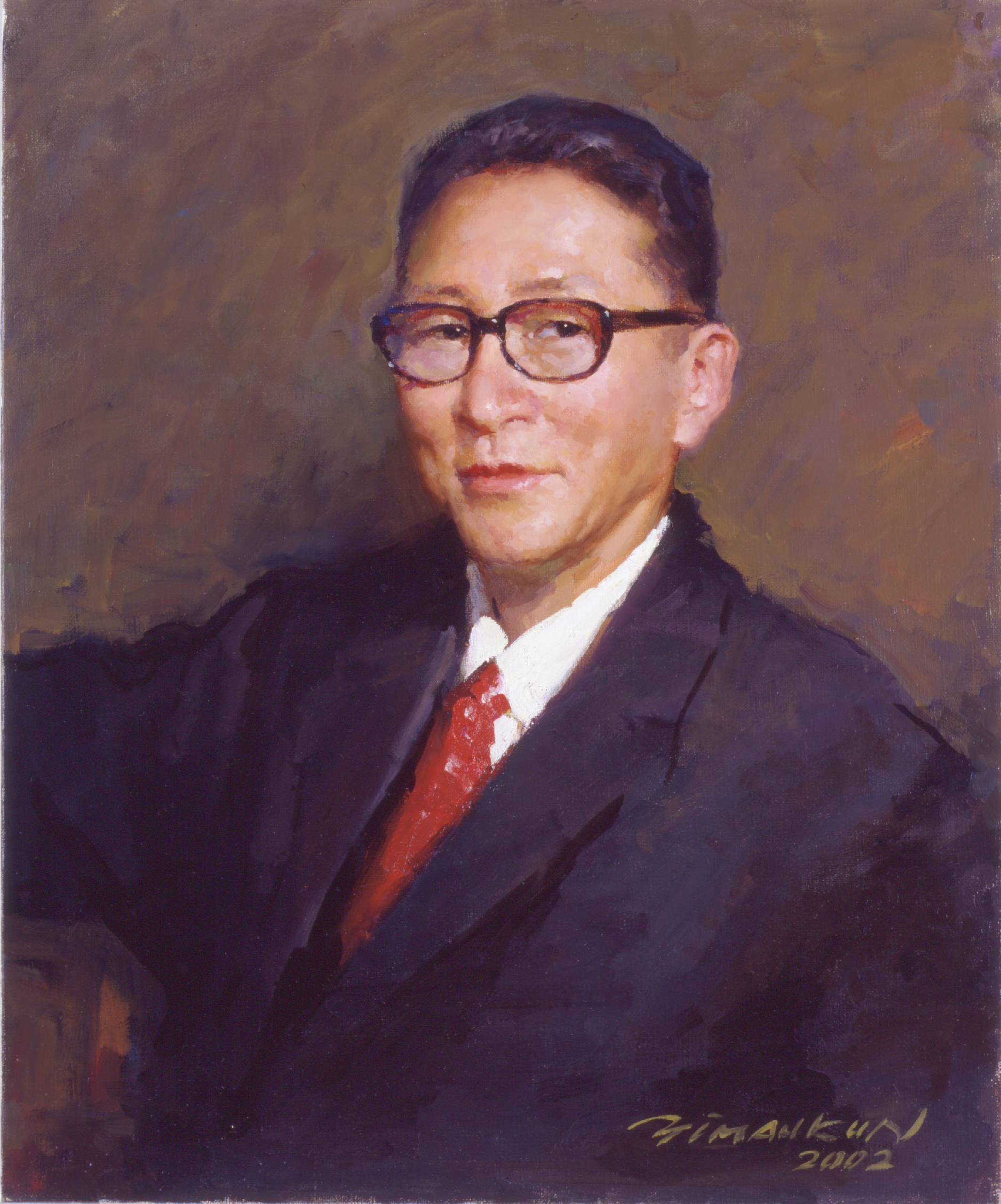
Portrait of Li Ao, oil on canvas, 2002

Yim has been commissioned to do portraits of many prominent figures in Taiwan, Hong Kong, and mainland China, from politicians and business leaders to pop stars—and also of fellow painters, perhaps the foremost sign of respect among peers. Portraits include former Taiwanese Prime Minister Lee Huan, the writer and historian Li Ao, the artist Ren Zhenhan, architect Chen Mingnen, Mandopop singer Yao Surong, and luminaries like Zhou Lianhua, pastor emeritus of Grace Baptist Church (also family pastor to Chiang Kai-shek), and Yang Qi, former Secretary of XinHua News Agency in Hong Kong. A figure painting (i.e., full nude) of the Hong Kong talk show host Pamila Peck Wan Kam was featured as the back cover of a political magazine in Hong Kong, which generated publicity. Yim is also known for his portraits of average people, be they indigenous Taiwanese or Tibetans, rural boatmen in Xiangxi, young art students, or random European hostelers traveling through Taiwan or Hong Kong.

== Historical and narrative works of note ==
Crossing the Stormy Strait (1996) and Reaching Shore (1995) portray dramatic scenes from the history of the Chinese settlement of Taiwan. In Crossing, it is the struggle of immigrants from Fujian to defy an imperial decree by the Qing government and brave the fierce waters of the Taiwan strait; Reaching Shore is then the weary relief and hopeful excitement of first stepping foot on the island, something Yim himself related to as a native mainlander who moved to Taiwan in his forties. The paintings show the heroism of these otherwise ordinary individuals who would become the founding fathers and mothers of Taiwan.

The Death of Concubine Yang (1999), which took ten years to complete, gives a sense of the complex political intrigue and civil turmoil that culminated in the murder of the Tang Emperor's consort Yang Guifei as part of quelling the An Lushan Rebellion, along with the melancholy moment after the deed itself. The episode is a famous (or infamous) one in the history of China and has been frequently dramatized in Chinese literature, opera, television, and film. Yim's painting was published in International Artist Magazine in its August/September 2004 issue.

Mackay and the Children of Tamshui (1994) and Mackay Practicing Medicine (1995) feature George Leslie Mackay (1844-1901), an important Canadian missionary—and licensed dentist—in Taiwan. Apart from his proselytizing and teeth-pulling, Mackay also opened hospitals and schools, mastered the language, married a Chinese woman, and was ultimately buried in Taiwan. In Mackay Practicing Medicine, the dentist is seen plying his trade (presumably without anesthetic for the patient) while lamplight illuminates the concerned faces of the local Taiwanese onlookers. Li Ao later wrote an essay in tribute of the piece, calling it "tremendous . . . a fitting painting for a great man."

Sunset in the West (2011), another painting that took ten years to complete, depicts the Buddhist monk Xuanzhang's epic pilgrimage to India through the desert wilderness in the western regions of China to translate Buddhist scriptures and bring those back to China. It is a tale of perseverance and determination in the name of spiritual devotion and commitment to enlightenment, something Yim has managed to convey in a single scene. As Yim has made clear in interviews and his writings, Xuanzhang is one of his favorite subjects, likely for reasons relating to his own life story and the difficult path he has had to travel as an artist and a man.

2013's Emperor Guangxu and Consort Zhen centers on the ill-fated progressive Qing leader, whose Hundred Days' Reform movement of 1898 was thwarted by the Empress Dowager Cixi and her co-conspirators. Guangxu would be deposed and his consort drowned after defying Cixi (originally Zhen was only sentenced to prison, but she refused to obey the command to announce that the emperor was leaving the palace and then was condemned to die by Cixi).

Yim also captured stories of contemporary life, whether it is the lonely restaurant scene of Stood Up (1992) the tender portrayal of the young woman on the payphone in Evening Spring Rain in Taipei (1993), or the barmaid slicing fruit in Tonight (1990).

== Style ==
While a Realist, Yim rejects photo-realism in favor of a loose, more relaxed approach that is not obsessed with precision. There is more of an emphasis on the essence and harmony of the overall composition; this creates a lifelike resemblance that brings out the poetic qualities, mood, and beauty of the subject rather than an exact reproduction dwelling on superficial details. He employs the Chinese Jian Bi (減筆) method of using fewer brushstrokes and thicker brushes in a freer style, which Western viewers will often mistake for Impressionism. As he explained in an International Artist magazine article, "oil painting is not simply the process of turning drawings into paintings by applying paint, but rather a creative process whereby paint is transformed into a language of color"—and using different brushstrokes and textures is crucial for creating this effect. For Yim, the relationship of the colors takes precedence over the form, with results that transcend realism but, importantly, never lose their grounding in reality. Yim does not speak in terms of "rules" for oil painting but instead the guiding principles that can be followed in many different ways.

== Influences ==
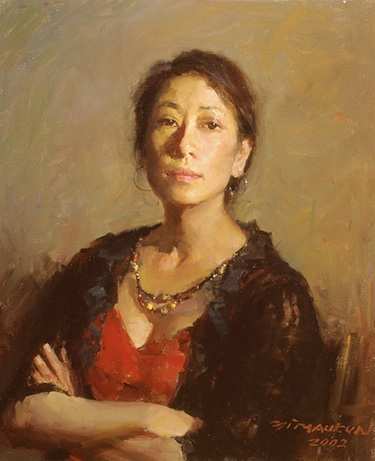
Lady in Shimmering Light, oil on canvas, 2002

While a student at the Guangzhou Academy, Yim received solid training in the basics of drawing and watercolor painting (along with a smattering of sculpture), but as an oil painter he is effectively self-taught. He cites the great Russian masters of nineteenth century Realism as his primary influences: Korovin, Repin, Surikov, Serov, Kramskoi, Shiskin, Levitan, along with the early twentieth century Russian realist Fechin. The French painter Millet and Spanish painter Sorolla (both nineteenth century Realists), the French impressionist Renoir and post-Impressionist Cézanne, along of course with towering Renaissance artists like Raphael, DaVinci, Velázquez, and Rembrandt and the 20th century American realist Andrew Wyeth, are also credited with helping to inspire Yim's love for painting and his particular approach. From the Chinese tradition he draws upon the spirit and "philosophy" of Chinese painting and poetry, which seeks to create a poetic ambience (or yijing, discussed by Wang Guowei in his Poetic Remarks in the Human World) instead of the obsessive attempt to communicate every last detail.

== Critical reception and reviews ==
The United Daily newspaper referred to the Taiwan crossing paintings as "a joy to view." In the January 2006 issue of The Artist's Magazine, which featured Yim's Lady in Shimmering Light as its cover, Yim's painting is described as a "stunning work" which has a "classic quality that crosses geographic and cultural boundaries." The prominent writer Li Ao, one of Taiwan's foremost public intellectuals, heaped similar praise on Yim's Mackay Practicing Medicine in a supplement to the Yangcheng Evening News in 2008 and also on his television show. Lin Yong, former President of the Guangdong Artists' Association, waxes poetic in a memorable passage: "Yim Mau-Kun has spent decades quietly, calmly, diligently and thoughtfully painting. I don't know how many drawings and paintings he's created, and I don't know how many books he has read. But over the decades, whenever we talk he often has impressive insights; he has never stopped thinking. It's his diligence in studying, thinking, and articulating his thoughts that make me think of him as a Confucian scholar. His insights have been very beneficial for me. I see deep wrinkles in an old tree, ripples in a river, a rock unmoved by thunder and storms, a massive tree that remains unbent, and I see in Yim Mau-Kun a refreshing spring breeze." Liang Jiang—former Deputy Director of the National Art Museum of China and former Director of the Art Institute of China Army Academy—in the essay "True to Himself" for Taiwan's Arts and Literature Daily celebrates at length Yim's still lifes, landscapes, as well as Crossing the Stormy Strait and Reaching Shore. Ned Jacob, nationally renowned artist and teacher at the Scottsdale Artists' School, in the foreword to A Classical Guide to How to Draw the Head speaks of Yim as "a craftsman of surpassing ability and sensibility", a "brave and vociferous champion of the classical legacy", whose works "resonate [with] virtuosity and boldness of handling. . . .Treasures such as these – sacredly kept – will comfort us in those hours when fears and doubts come calling."

Yim continues to receive international acclaim. A 2014 Youth Daily News article focused in particular on Yim's drawing, with the reporter relating in memorable detail the experience of witnessing one of the artist's "astounding and exciting" live demonstrations. Fellow artists and various visitors to his website have referred to Yim and his art as "masterful", "expressive", "beautiful", classic yet fresh. Ghanaian artist and teacher Jonathan Kwegyir Aggrey praises Yim as "an amazing painter" who "kept true to his own vision." In the words of Canadian painter and sculptor Paul Brunelle, Yim's approaches are "masterful, refined, insightful...[T]his is the degree of mastery that I strive for." American painter Damian Goidoch describes Yim's style as "masterful, subtle, knowledgeable, personal, expressive, beautiful", further stating that "Perhaps the most striking element to Master Yim's painting and drawing is the use of light, which infuses his art with a sense of hopefulness; a feeling of lightness and emotional connection with the subject. This connection is magnified when color is present, and Master Yim's understanding of color in its tactile use and symbolic relationship embody his subjects with a welcoming aura that allows the viewer to approach his work without inhibition. . . . Mau-Kun Yim is one of the finest figure drawing and painting artists working today. Every drawing is a complete lesson in itself and one can learn all there is about drawing."

== Publications ==
By Yim Mau-kun:

- Paintings by Mau-Kun Yim (Catalog), Hong Kong, 1985
- Landscape Paintings of Southern Taiwan (Catalog), Taiwan, 1988
- Landscape Paintings of Hunan (Central China) (Catalog), Taiwan, 1989
- The Splendor of Taiwan (Catalog), Taiwan, 1990
- Landscape Paintings of France (Catalog), Taiwan, 1991
- Dreams from Afar, Crown Publishing, Taiwan, 1991
- Landscape Paintings of New Zealand (Catalog), Taiwan, 1994
- In Retrospect: A Review of Paintings from 1991-1993 (Catalog), Taiwan, 1994
- Drawings by Mau-Kun Yim (Self-publish), Taiwan, 1994
- "History's Promise", United Daily, Taiwan, 1995
- Taiwan Forefathers Series I: Arriving at the Shore (Catalog), Taiwan, 1995
- Taiwan Forefathers Series II: Crossing the Taiwan Strait (Catalog), Taiwan, 1996
- "Crossing Taiwan Strait", United Daily, Taiwan, 1996
- A Journey to Northwest China (Painting diary, Self-published), Taiwan, 1998
- Drawings by Mau-Kun Yim, 2nd Edition (Self-published), Taiwan, 2000
- "Realism and Foundation Training", Art Magazine, China, 2001
- Drawings by Mau-Kun Yim, Guangxi Fine Art Publishing, China, 2003
- Memories of Europe, Hunan Fine Art Publishing, China, 2003
- "A Language of Color", International Artist 38, August/September 2004
- How to Draw the Head, Guangxi Fine Art Publishing, China, 2005
- Drawing with Mau-Kun Yim, DVD Series, Haosheng Fine Arts, Taiwan, 2006
- A New Language of Drawing, Guangxi Fine Art Publishing, China, 2007
- The Pastel Journal, Guangxi Fine Art Publishing, China, 2007
- Strokes of Genius, pp. 30–31, North Light/IMPACT Books, U.S., 2007
- A Tale of Small Paintings, Guangxi Fine Art Publishing, China, 2008
- The Process of Drawing, Guangxi Fine Art Publishing, China, 2009
- Mini-landscape Paintings, Guangxi Fine Art Publishing, China, 2010
- Mau-Kun Yim, 100 Years of Taiwan Artists, Cedar Life Ltd., 2010
- Oil Painting with Yim Mau-Kun, Ever Ode Arts Communication, Taipei, 2011
- "Chen Yifei and me", Changde Evening Daily, China, 2011
- Drawing Handbook, Guangxi Fine Art Publishing, China, 2012
- "The Ideal of Drawing", Language of Art Magazine, Hong Kong, 2012
- Sketching Handbook, Guangxi Fine Art Publishing, China, 2013
- Landscape Handbook, Guangxi Fine Art Publishing, China, 2014
- Strokes of Genius, North Light/IMPACT Books, U.S., 2015
- Drawings by Contemporary Masters, Guangxi Fine Art Publishing, China, 2015
- A Retrospective – The Art of Mau-Kun Yim, Guangxi Fine Art Publishing, China, 2016
- A Classical Guide to How to Draw the Head, North Light, U.S., 2016
- Lessons in Masterful Portrait Drawing: A Classical Approach to Drawing the Head, North Light, U.S., 2017

About Yim Mau-kun:

- Hao Hejun 郝鶴君, "Nuwa Mending the Sky [女媧補天]" Art Gallery (Journal of the Guangdong Artists' Association) 廣東美術家協會刊物「畫廊」創刊期, China, 1979
- Hong Wen-ching 洪文慶, "Yim Mau-kun - The Touching Recreation of Historical Scenes [冉茂芹 － 再現歷史現場的動感]", in 100 Years, Taiwan Artists 台灣名家美術, 2010
- Huang Pu Zhi-hua, "The Singer of Life: a Poet of Nature", August 2009, reprinted in the booklet for Oil Painting with Yim Mau-Kun, Ever Ode Arts Communication, Taipei, 2011
- Li Ao 李敖, "From Mackay Practicing Medicine to Andrew T. Huang [從馬偕行醫圖到黃達夫]", Yancheng Evening News [supplement] 羊城晚報, April 29, 2010
- Liang Jiang 梁江, "True to Himself [恪守真誠]", Arts and Literature Daily 文藝報, China, March 6, 1997
- Li Mei-ling 李梅齡, "Portraits of Lee Tung-hui and Lee Huan by Hong Kong Artist Yim Mau-kun [主標：香港畫家冉茂芹筆下的雙李神態， 副標：李總統高大健康不怒而威、李揆笑容可掬精神矍鑠]", China Times 中國時報, Taiwan, January 5, 1990
- Liu Yue-si 劉悅姒, "Yim Mau-Kun's Art and Paintings [冉茂芹的繪畫藝術]", Sun Yet-Sen Memorial Journal 台北「國父紀念館」館刊第 Taiwan, Vol. 9, May 2002
- Lin Wen, "Yim Maukun: Teacher of Realist Painting and Beyond."
- Qian Hai-yuan 錢海源, "Interpreting Yim Mau-Kun and His Art [解讀冉茂芹和他的油畫藝術", Art in China 藝術中國, China, Vol. 7, 2009
- Shen Meihua 沈美華, "Yim Mau-kun - Pure Art through Drawing [冉茂芹 － 用素描表達藝術的純度]" Youth Daily 青年日報, China, 2014
- Steve Smith, "Language Without Words", The Artist's Magazine, January 2006
- Coverage on "Taiwan Forefathers" series and research and painting process by Guangzhou Evening Daily, 1995
- Teoh Yi Chie, Book Review of Contemporary Drawing Series: Drawing Handbook, September 2012
- Xie Minchang 謝明錩, "A Joy to View Arriving Shore of Taiwan Forefather Series [喜見先民渡海 – 抵岸]", United Daily' 聯合報,' Taiwan, 1995
- Xu Xing 許行, "Portrait Artist Yim Mau-Kun [肖像畫家冉茂芹]", The Young Companion of Hong Kong' 良友雜誌,' May 1985
- Coverage of Yim Mau-Kun's award in the International Salon, Greenhouse Gallery, San Antonio, in Guangzhou Evening Daily, China, July 30, 2005
- "Yim Mau-Kun's Homecoming Painting Trip [冉茂芹畫游故鄉]", Hunan Art Newspaper 湖南畫報, China, 1989 (2:141)
- Yi Xing 益行, "Yim Mau-Kun's Realism and Romanticism [寫實浪漫冉茂芹]", Xin Bao Daily 香港《信報》副刊《讀畫》, Hong Kong, 2014

== Published artwork ==
- Featured Artwork, Ming Pao Monthly, Hong Kong, 1979
- "Nu Wa" published in Hong Kong's Ming Pao Monthly, 1980
- "Quiet Girl", Yangcheng Evening News, China
- "Sunset", "Jufen", "Night Life", and "Confident" published in Hong Kong City Monthly, 1984
- "Lady in Red" published on Guangdong Arts and Literature magazine cover, China, 1986
- "Warrior Song" published in Guangdong Arts and Literature magazine and Guangzhou Art Academics, China, 1987
- "University Student" and "Girl in White", cover of Crown Magazine, November 1987
- "Orchid Valley" published on the cover of Crown Monthly, Taiwan, May, 1990
- "Pamila Peck Wan Kam" published in Independent Daily, Taiwan, 1991
- "Portrait of Zhao Ziyang", published on the cover of Far Eastern Economic Review, 1987
- "Art Student" published in Open Magazine, Hong Kong, 1994
- "Herds in the Moonlight" published in Artist Magazine, Taiwan, 1994
- "Crossing the Stormy Strait" published in the Art Magazine in Beijing, China, 1997
- "Deep Autumn" and "Tonight" published in Guangzhou Evening Daily, China, 1997
- "Sakura" published in Independent Daily, Taiwan, 2004
- "Lady in Green" and "Death of Concubine Yang", International Artist Magazine, August/September, 2004.
- "Bronze Bracelet" published in International Artist magazine, U.S., 2005
- "Lady in Shimmering Light" published in Guangzhou Art Academics, China, 2005
- "Lady in Shimmering Light" and coverage of The Artist's Magazine cover award published in United Daily, Taiwan, 2006
- "Crossing the Stormy Strait" published in Overseas Chinese Weekly, U.S., 2006
- Art work featured in Xijiang Moon Journal of Zhaoqing Artists' Association of Guangdong, China, 2011
- Art work published in Zhaoqing Culture Bimonthly, China, 2014
- Portrait of Taiwan's former president Ma Ying Jiu's parents published in United Evening Daily, Taiwan, 2014
- "Honeydew and Plum" published in Art Magazine of Beijing, China, 2015
- Television appearances and YouTube clips:
- "Drawing DVD on Air", Art Live program, China TV, January 27-February 2007 [series].
- Oil Painting, Beautiful Life Television, Taiwan, December 6-December 27, 2013 [series].
- Interview, Art Dreamer, China TV, August 6, 2015. https://www.youtube.com/watch?v=8aFxE4STT2U
- Charcoal Drawing with Nitram Charcoal by Yim Mau Kun, https://www.youtube.com/watch?v=Gff-o0jdcx4
- Demo How to Paint Still Life in oil https://www.youtube.com/watch?v=VNKQVEB9W_s
- Demo How to Paint Still Life in oil https://www.youtube.com/watch?v=FWaAMd4mrDU
- Demo How to Paint Plein Air Landscapes in oil https://www.youtube.com/watch?v=w8qfoW15aQk
- Demo How to Paint Pleir Air Landscapes in oil https://www.youtube.com/watch?v=e6SYYEt6Hbk
- How to Draw the Head by Yim Mau-Kun (Trailer) https://www.youtube.com/watch?v=yL9HPu3TBVI
- Nirtram Presents a Charcoal Portrait by Yim Mau-kun, https://www.youtube.com/watch?v=Q8a6J6E754Y
- oil Painting with Mau-Kun Yim https://www.youtube.com/watch?v=j0NKx8C4yvE
- Portrait Painting with Mau-Kun Yim https://www.youtube.com/watch?v=PnGYZ8h_oTw
- Yim Mau-Kun's oil Painting https://www.youtube.com/watch?v=sx2Q6tQhq3A

== See also ==
- Taiwanese art
