= Cai Jin =

Chinese painter (born 1965)

- Born: 1965 (age 60–61); Tunxi, Anhui, China
- Education: Central Academy of Fine Arts, Beijing, China; Anhui Normal University, Anhui, China
- Known for: Painting

Cai Jin (Chinese: 蔡锦; born 1965) is a Chinese painter best known for her oil paintings of the banana plant. Cai was born in Tunxi, Anhui Province, China in 1965. Cai studied art at the Anhui Teachers University in Wuhu, China, graduating in 1985. She went on to participate in the Advanced Oil Painting Program of the Central Academy of Fine Arts in Beijing, where she studied until 1991. She worked in New York between 1997 and 2007. Cai teaches at Tianjin Fine Arts Institute in Tianjin, China. Cai Jin has been featured in articles for the ArtDaily and The Brooklyn Rail.

== Works ==
Cai Jin was inspired by a wilting banana plant that she discovered on a visit to her hometown in China. She took two rolls of photographs of the plant growing among weeds, and carried them with her for inspiration. For the next twenty years these remained her focus. Cai Jin has completed more than 400 works, mostly oil paintings. Her work is characterized by its psychedelic colors, such as pink, purple, blue, and especially red. Jin uses the image of the banana plant in her work to explore beauty, fertility, and sexuality. While she has primarily produced oils on canvas, Cai has painted on such materials as mattresses, silk quilts, cushions, women’s shoes, bicycle seats, and bath tubs. Her paintings explore vitality and beauty.

In 2008, Cai deviated from her focus on the banana plant and began work on a series of landscape paintings. While the title of the series is Landscape the paintings are lyrical and organic, showing influences of both Western and traditional Chinese sources. These are evocative of submarine landscapes or cloud-filled skies and verge on abstraction, but without totally abandoning their origin in the world around her.

=== Exhibitions ===
- Cai Jin Hanart TZ Gallery, Hong Kong, 2021
- Double X, Ethan Cohen Gallery, New York, New York, 2019
- RT021 Shanghai Contemporary Art Fair, Triumph Art Space, Beijing, China, 2015
- White Box 2014 Art & Design 100, WhiteBox Art Center, Beijing, China, 2014
- Return to the Source, Chambers Fine Art, Beijing and New York, 2013
- Cai Jin, National Art Museum of China, Beijing, 2012
- Cai Jin: Works on Paper, Hadrien de Montferrand Gallery, Beijing, 2011
- Red Tide - Cai Jin, Galerie PICI, Seoul, Korea, 2008
- Cai Jin, Beijing Cube Gallery, Beijing, 2007
- Cai Jin: Eros in Red, Hanart TZ Gallery, Hong Kong, 2005
- Beauty Banana Series: The Art of Cai Jin, Goedhuis Contemporary, New York, 2003
- Cai Jin: Sound in Red, Fujikawa Gallery/Next, Osaka, Japan, 2000
- Cai Jin, Herbert F. Johnson Museum of Art, Cornell University, USA, 2000
- Banana Plants Paintings, Alexander Ochs Galleries, Berlin, Germany, 1999
- Cai Jin: Off the Canvas, The Courtyard Gallery, Beijing
- Cai Jin: Chinese Hand Studies from Life, Ethan Cohen Fine Art, New York, 1997
- Cai Jin: Recent Works, Kiang Gallery, Atlanta, USA, 1995
- Cai Jin's Oil Paintings, Art Gallery of the Central Academy of Fine Arts, Beijing, 1991
