= Sakimichan =

Digital artist

- Born: Yue Wang; June 18, 1991 (age 35)
- Education: Dawson College
- Known for: Fanart

Sakimichan is the pen name of Yue Wang, a Canadian artist known for her digital paintings and unique style, particularly those in which she draws fanart of game and popular characters, and creating GIFs for her fans with voice acting.

== Education and work ==
After graduating from Dawson College in 3D animation in 2012, she began work at BioWare as a Junior Concept Artist where she worked briefly on designs for Mass Effect: Andromeda. She participated in various art and comic conventions, including the Anime Expo in Los Angeles, and is a regular artist at both Anime North and Fan Expo Canada in Toronto. In 2017, she attended the Singapore Toy Game and Comic Convention (STGCC) as a guest artist. Currently, she makes most of her income from creating both original and fan-based work and tutorials on Patreon. In 2019, she started a sponsor page for Chinese fans, although this page is no longer active as of 2025.

Some of her fan art pieces include genderbends, where a male character is redesigned as a female character or vice versa.
