= Wu Siu Ping, Evan =

Hong Kong artist

- Born: Hong Kong
- Education: Royal Melbourne Institute of Technology
- Known for: Chinese ink painting Paper art Mixed media
- Website: evanwuart.tumblr.com

Wu Siu Ping, Evan (Chinese: 胡小萍) is a Hong Kong artist specializing in contemporary Chinese ink painting, paper art and mixed media. She works in the Graphic Design of advertisement in Hong Kong.

== Early life ==
Evan was born and raised in Hong Kong. She studied graphic design and jewelry design at the Design First Institute of Art & Design and Hong Kong Polytechnic University. In 2012, she graduated with a Fine Art master's degree in RMIT University. Her work has since been shown in various places, including Hong Kong Cultural Centre, Shantou University China and Hong Kong Art Centre at the same year.

== Career and artwork ==
=== Exhibitions ===
==== “Tidbits of Life” ====
With a touch of Chinese ink and the likes of other media that time round, Wu reinterpreted Hong Kong's most iconic culture and places in her painting exhibition (May 12 – June 26, 2014) at the Artify Gallery in Chai Wan. Evan drew inspirations from her daily life, representing the artworks in Chinese ink, rubbing and mixed media. Combining a sense of humour with traditional elements, Evan aspired to provide the audience with alternate element of Hong Kong culture with her work.

Pray represented the local worshipping culture. By filling the paper with flowing incense, the artist alluded to the annual flocks of worshippers to temples during Lunar New Year. Known for their hardworking and pragmatic attitude, Hong Kong people secretly long for humble pleasure like health and harmony, while they diligently pray to the gods. Similarly, the artist wisely showed the local worshipping culture in Forever Beauty. Evan paid tribute to local wisdom by depicting women enjoying masks homemade from ingredients such as tea bags and cucumber. The formula of the masks nearly formed the backdrop of the work.

Apart from local culture, Evan was also entranced by nooks and crannies of the city. Among her favorite places, the Whole Fruit Market represented extraordinary importance to her, as it was on the way to her child’s school. Fruit Plate depicted fresh fruit on a traditional wooden cart, nestled among old buildings in the area. The collision of the old and the new fascinated the artist.

Another work, Bird House, would easily trigger echoes from the audience. The work featured overlapping birdcages forming a silhouette of the city, we well as the local icon Lion Mountain in the middle. ‘The price of the city makes it hard for us to materialize our dream home. Perhaps an illusional city peaked through bird cages is more attainable to us, ‘said Wu.

=== Exhibition about Butterfly ===
There are several exhibitions about butterfly.

==== “Revivification” ====
The exhibition of "Revivification" was held in several places including City Walk gallery in Tsuen Wan (April 14 – May 29, 2013) and the Fo Guang Yuan Art Gallery in Teipei (January 22 – March 13, 2016). Apart from providing an opportunity for audience to appreciate the beauty of the artworks, Wu also aimed to remind the importance of environmental protection via the reminiscent butterfly. Wu collected many magazines from different sources, most of them being completely unused. In hopes of utilizing them wisely, Wu decided to use them as raw materials to design different kinds of artwork. During the process of designing, Wu found it good to make them to butterfly-shaped artworks. After Wu finished them, Wu provoked the thinking of promoting the sense of environmental protection through artwork. Subsequently, Wu participated in different workshops, for example, New Life Butterfly Workshop, which is about the reborn of butterfly, aiming to promote the sense of environmental protection to the public.

==== "Transformation" ====
The exhibition of "Transformation" was displayed from June 1 to June 30, 2013, at City Walk gallery in Tsuen Wan. The idea which is highly emphasized on is that (Recycle, Renew, Reborn). Apart from the artwork which is made of the papers of expired magazines, there were some artworks is made of crystal, plastic, and laser painting. The artworks shown in this exhibition is the extension of "Revivification". Wu utilized the techniques of painting into making the butterfly-shape artworks, which were made of outdated magazine alive by outlining the butterfly pattern silk and expressing them in a poetic form. It allowed the audience to reflect on the values and meanings of magazines. "The Search of butterfly" was shown in two different ways. The first way is mixing the butterfly patterns and random magazine patchwork pictures. By changing the picture's information from the original magazine expression, Wu transformed them into a beautiful butterfly pattern. The second way is the systematic selection of magazine pictures and butterfly pattern combination, which allowed the two to conflict and reassemble into new butterfly picture. It enabled the audience to experience different visual effects and further understand the hidden meaning behind the work. As for the other artworks in "Collection of butterfly", which emphasized on its black-and-white photo effects, Wu solidified it in the crystal box. The artwork expressed the meaning of butterfly, which is never vanishing and eternity, unlike the magazines' ephemeral fate.

=== Sky100 x Fotanian Art Exhibition ===
Collaborating with fellow artist Yan Fung, Wu displayed her artworks in the Sky100 from April 5 to June 15, 2014. Titled "The Flavours of Hong Kong", the exhibition aimed to shed light on the local life in Hong Kong back in the days, mainly consisting old-school local fusion and love from family. Displaying artworks about Chinese herb tea and having dimsum, Wu artworks provoked local Hong Kong people to reminisce on their childhood and the simplicity of living back then, as those food and fusion made their childhood. Together with the artworks about love from family by Fung, the exhibition brought back the memories of Hong Kong people to life. It was a vivid display of how life used to be in Hong Kong to tourists all around the world, and to children born in the Millennials as well, who have never experienced the simple yet beautiful lifestyle.
