= Zhang Jian-Jun =

Chinese contemporary artist and curator

- Born: Shanghai, China
- Education: Shanghai Theatre Academy
- Known for: Chinese Abstraction

Chinese name
- Traditional Chinese: 張健君
- Simplified Chinese: 张健君
- Hanyu Pinyin: Zhāng Jiànjūn

Zhang Jian-Jun (張健君; born 1955), is a Chinese contemporary artist and curator based in Shanghai and New York. He is known for being an active member of China's avant-garde art scene in Shanghai during the 1980s. He is currently the Clinical Associate Professor of Arts at New York University Shanghai.

== Career ==
Zhang graduated from the Department of Fine Art at Shanghai Theatre Academy in 1978, majoring in oil painting. After graduating he started working for Shanghai Art Museum, later becoming its first director of the Curatorial and Art Research Department in 1986. In 1987, he was invited by the Asian Cultural Council of the Rockefeller Foundation in New York for an academic study visit.

In his artistic career, Zhang has received the Asian Cultural Council Fellowship, as well as two Pollock-Krasner Foundation Grants, a New York Foundation for the Arts Fellowship, and more. He has participated in the International Curatorial Program at MoMA in New York. As one of the representative artists for the earliest abstract art in China, Zhang began pursuing abstract painting in the early 1980s. He pioneered the use os materials such as sand, rock, pottery directly in painting in China.

In September 2019, Zhang had a two-month residency at the Royal Academy of Arts in London, as the fourth artist taking part in the three-year artist-in-residence programme co-presented with K11 Art Foundation. The residency involved the creation of a new mixed-media installation work titled Human Traces. The work was exhibited at Zhang's solo show of the same name at his studio in the Smirke 2 Studio of RA Schools, from 5 September to 14 September 2019.

== Artistic practice ==
Over the course of forty years, Zhang has created works in various mediums, from photography, ink installation, video, performances to painting. From the 1990s onward, Zhang began to abandon the pre-existing style and started to further turn his focus to conceptual art, emphasizing the practice of installation and performance, including his 1994 outdoor performance To Fuse, executed at Djerassi Sculpture Park, California.

Zhang began to frequently visit Shanghai after 2000, and his practice also evolved with an emphasis on his Chinese heritage. Much of Zhang's work tries to explore the complicated relationships between different cultures, essentially between traditional Chinese and contemporary culture.

== Museum collections ==
Zhang's works are included in the institutional collections of the Brooklyn Museum, New York; Asian Art Museum, San Francisco; the Djerassi Sculpture Park, California; M+ Museum, Hong Kong; Guangdong Museum of Art, China; Shanghai Art Museum, China; Yuz Museum Shanghai, Shanghai.
