= Cao Yu (artist) =

Chinese contemporary artist

- 曹雨
- Born: 1988 (age 36–37); Liaoning
- Known for: Installation art, video art, sculpture, performance art，photography, painting

Cao Yu (Chinese: 曹雨; pinyin: Cáo Yǔ; born 1988; BFA & MA, Sculpture, Central Academy of Fine Arts) is a contemporary artist whose work span a diverse range of media that encompass installation, sculpture, Photography, video and performance and painting.

== Biography ==
Cau Yu was born in Liaoning province. She lives and works in Beijing.

== Career ==
Spring was Yu's graduate school presentation at the Central Academy of Fine Arts was, which drew art world attention. Fountain, was later displayed on a vertical HD screen, shows a continuous moving-image loop of the artist expressing milk from her breasts. The sequence lasts 9 minutes. Cao Yu made the piece soon after giving birth. According to the artist, "Fountain appears beautiful and explosive, but to me it's about pain. The frequent pain from mastitis forced me to release the milk trapped in my body. At that moment I felt how amazing my body is, and I wanted to create a fountain by using my body as a vessel." Art historical influences include Marcel Duchamp's Fountain (1917), Bruce Nauman's Self-Portrait as a Fountain (1966), and Ingres' The Source (1856). Another work Dragon Head was shown in the Empowerment exhibition of women artists at the Kunstmuseum Wolfsburg，Salzburg，Germany. In 2022, she was interviewed by the German magazine Monopol.

Her work has been exhibited at several venues including MAK Museum für Angewandte Kunst, Vienna, Austria; Palais-de-Tokyo, Paris, France; Konfuzius-Institut Nürnberg-Erlangen, Nuremberg, Germany; Artspace, Sydney, Australia; Minsheng Art Museum, China; Martina Tauber Fine Art, Munich, Germany; Camera Club New York, US; Diskurs，Berlin，Germany; Today Art Museum, Beijing, China; etc.

In 2018, she won the Best Young Artist of the Year·The 12th AAC Award.

== Collections ==
Her work is included in the M+ Collection, Hong Kong.

== Publications by the artist ==
- I Have an Hourglass Waist, 2017, Galerie Urs Meile ISBN 978-3-906134-38-3
