= Fabien Fryns =

Belgian art dealer and collector

Fabien Fryns is a Belgian art dealer and collector, residing in Beijing since 2004. He has worked in the art world since 1986, specializing in contemporary Chinese art since 2000.

== Early life ==
Fryns grew up in Belgium, and from 1984 to 1988 he attended the prestigious Le Rosey School in Switzerland. He first started dealing and collecting art in 1986, and has been active in the art world ever since. Upon graduating from Le Rosey with an IB, he was the youngest student to enroll in the two year History of Art Course at Christie's London (1988–1990), graduating with a bachelor's degree in Fine Arts. Thereafter, he graduated from the European Business School (EBS) in London in 1994 with a Bachelor in International Business degree. In 1994 Fryns opened F2 Gallery Ltd, then located in the fabled Marbella Club Hotel in Marbella, Spain (1994–2004). Subsequently, Fryns partnered with UBS Private Banking and jointly opened Fabien Fryns Fine Art – UBS Cultural Centre in Marbella (1999 - 2001).

== Contemporary Chinese Art ==
In 2000, Fryns turned to contemporary Chinese art, which led to his moving to Beijing in 2004 and subsequently opening F2 Gallery in 1995, the second gallery in Caochangdi, joining CAAW. Later, Three Shadows Art Center, Platform China and The Courtyard Gallery followed suit. F2 Gallery was one of the first galleries in China to show western artists.

== Los Angeles expansion ==
In 2006, he expanded and opened DF2 Gallery in Los Angeles in a partnership, and subsequently took it over and renamed it Fabien Fryns Fine Art, Los Angeles.

== Relationship with artists ==
Artists shown and affiliated with the galleries include Sun Yuan and Peng Yu, Sheng Qi, Li Qing, Chen Man, Henry Hudson, Lars Mikkes, Cui Xiuwen, Feng Shu, Zhang Huan, Cui Jie, Hu Xiaoyuan, Qiu Xiaofei, Zheng Lu, Xu Hualing, Zhu Fadong, Zeng Fanzhi, Yan Shaobin, Tang Zhigang, Liu Ye, Li Songsong, Shi Xinning, Feng Zhengjie, Yin Zhaoyang, Liu Hung, Sui Jianguo, Ling Jian, Zheng Guogu, Xun Sun, Tu hongtao, Chen Ke, Jiao Xingtao, Wu Junyong, Yuan Yuan, Zhou Yilun, Jiang Zhi, Yang Liming, Ji Dachun, Lu Xinjian, among others.

On an institutional level, Fryns conceived China Gold, with curator Alona Kagen, which took place at the Musée Maillol in Paris during the 2008 Summer Olympics. Artists associated with the show included Ai Weiwei, Cui Xiuwen, Zhang Dali, Yue Minjun, Wang Guangyi, Ma Liuming, Cang Xin, Wang Qingsong, Ling Jian, Yin Zhaoyang, Feng Zhengjie, Yang Shaobin, Zeng Fanzhi, Zhang Xiaogang, Tang Zhigang, Zhang Huan, Li Qing and Zheng Guogu, among others.

Since meeting Zeng Fanzhi in 2005, Fryns became a trusted friend, advisor, collector and main secondary market dealer for the artist's work. Fryns also played an important role in introducing the artist to top collectors and dealers worldwide, including Jose Mugrabi.

In 2009, Fryns played a crucial role in organising Zeng Fanzhi's solo show at Acquavella Galleries in NY. He also conceived and edited the monograph on the artist, published by Hatje Cantz in 2009, including a text by Dr. Richard Shiff and introduction by Fryns.

In 2010, Fryns organised a solo show for Zeng Fanzhi at the National Gallery for Foreign Art in Sofia, Bulgaria, and subsequently instigated the artist's most important museum show to date at the Musée d'Art Moderne de la Ville de Paris (October 16, 2013 to February 16, 2014).

In 2012, Fryns closed both the LA and Beijing galleries to focus on advising private and corporate clients, collecting, and continues working on unique projects to facilitate cross-cultural exchange, mainly between China and Europe.

Lu Xinjian continues to collaborate with Fabien Fryns Fine Art on special projects and exhibitions.

In February 2014, Fryns went on an initial trip to discover the art world in Saudi Arabia and is currently working on several cultural exchange projects between China and Saudi Arabia.

== Art collection ==
In a 2015 interview, Fryns was asked, "What is your art world pet peeve?" He replied, "I generally tend to take a very long-term vision when I collect artists' works, and never buy solely for speculation. The contemporary art market has become a very rapidly moving market and I feel that many “players” consider art purely as a commodity and have little patience to reap the benefits and move on to the next hot thing."
