= Beijing Commune =

Art gallery in Beijing, China

Beijing Commune (Chinese: 北京公社) is a China-based gallery, mainly featuring emerging artists' exhibitions.

== Commercial Gallery ==
Beijing Commune, located in the southern side of 798 Art Zone, was developed in 2004 by Leng Lin. It's a professional art gallery which exhibits and promotes Chinese contemporary art. It includes two exhibition halls, 17.5m x 9.5m and 10.95m x 7.06m large respectively.

An active art space, Beijing Commune has showcased miscellaneous artworks of both established and emerging Chinese artists, inclusive of painting, sculpture, video and photography, in an attempt to introduce the significant values of Chinese contemporary art to the world by means of regular shows and publishing catalogues.

Since its very beginning, Beijing Commune has received massive attentions in both domestic and international art scenes. Song Dong, as one of the established artists, was invited to hold a solo project at MoMA, New York City in 2009. Yin Xiuzhen, whose first exhibition‘Collective Subconscious’kicked off in 2007, were the second Chinese artists to be included in MoMA's ‘Projects’in 2010.

In recent years, the gallery focuses upon discovering potential artists of the younger generation. In 2010, video works of Ma Qiusha (b. 1982) and Zhao Yao (b. 1981) were shown at Tate Modern for "No Soul for Sale" festival, while Liang Yuanwei was one of the representative artists to join in the China Pavilion of the 54th Venice Biennale in 2011. Moreover, Hu Xiaoyuan (b. 1977) took part in group exhibition "THE UNGOVERNABLES-2012” of New Museum in 2012.

== Exhibitions ==
- 2014
  - GATE-OPENER
  - Song Ta: The Loveliest Guy
  - Xie Molin: Light/Deposits
  - Ma Qiusha: Works on Paper
  - N12-No.5
- 2013
  - Shang Yixin
  - Qiu Xiaofei: Rauschenberg Said, "the Walking Stick is Longer than the Maulstcik, after All."
  - Ma Qiusha: Raw
  - Liang Yuanwei: Pomegranate
- 2012
  - Hu Xiaoyuan
  - Shi Jin-hua
  - Zhao Yao (only Chinese)
  - Huang Yuxing
  - Ma Qiusha-STATIC ELECTRICITY
- 2011
  - Hong Hao-AS IT IS
  - Yuan Yuan-NEW WORKS
  - Zhao Yao-I am Your Night
  - Wang Guangle
  - Constructing Form
- 2010
  - Liang Yuanwei-Golden Notes
  - Hu Xiaoyuan
  - Xiao Yu-TURN AROUND
  - SEVEN YOUNG ARTISTS
- 2009
  - Ma Qiusha
  - TOFU, KUNGFU, POLIT-SHEER-FORM
  - HONG HAO-BOTTOM
  - Wang Guangle
  - Liu Jianhua-HORIZON
- 2008
  - Li Yousong
  - LIBRARY
  - Liu Lan COLLECTION
  - Liu Jianhua
  - North of Taiping Mountain is All Grassland
  - Landscape
- 2007
  - YIN XIUZHEN IN BEIJING COMMUNE
  - POLIT-SHEER-FORM
  - LOOKING FOR ART
  - SONG DONG IN BEIJING COMMUNE
  - THE STORY IS OVER
- 2006
  - PROPERTY OF L.W
  - Moving in the margins between history and society, Zhao Bandi creates a new, hitherto latent subject of social action. What does this mean?
  - LOOKING FOR TERRORISTS
  - HOME
  - NEWS
- 2005
  - SUBLIMATION-A New Art Project by Zhang Dali
  - ONLY ONE WALL
  - MAYFLY
  - THE GAME OF REALISM

== Artists currently represented ==
- Hu Xiaoyuan
- Liang Shuo
- Liang Yuanwei
- Lu Yang
- Ma Qiusha
- Qiu Xiaofei
- Shang Yixin
- Song Ta
- Wang Guangle
- Xie Molin
- Yu Ji
- Zhao Yao
- Zhang Xiaogang
