= Cui Xiuwen =

Chinese artist (1970–2018)

Cui Xiuwen (Chinese: 崔岫闻; 1967 – 1 August 2018) was a Chinese artist who made oil paintings, as well as video and photo works. Cui was a well-known contemporary artist in China. Her works have been collected by museums such as Tate Modern and the Brooklyn Museum.

== Life and work ==
Cui Xiuwen was born in Harbin, Heilongjiang, China. She attended the Fine Arts School of Northeast Normal UniversityNortheast Normal University and graduated in 1990. She then went on to study at China's Central Academy of Fine Arts and received her Master's of Fine Arts in 1996. At the time of her death in 2018 she lived and worked in Beijing, China.

She exhibited her work at Tate Modern, Florence Museum, Today Art Museum (Beijing), Fabien Fryns Fine Art, Eli Klein Fine Art Gallery (New York), Blindspot Gallery (Hong Kong), and Art Stage Singapore.

Cui has been identified as part of the Chinese Feminism movement, although she stated the following in an Artslant interview: "I think it's very limiting. It seems to just be a feature of the art market and very difficult to escape."

She is best known for her work Ladies' Room (2000), which was censored from being exhibited at the first Guangzhou Triennial. In this work, Cui hid an inconspicuous spy camera inside the ladies' bathroom of a popular Beijing karaoke club, recording unfiltered conversations and candid moments of local call girls getting ready for clients. In her series of photographs titled Existential Emptiness (2009), a schoolgirl and her life-sized doll companion are depicted in sparse and snowy landscapes, tackling themes of adolescence, identity, and mortality.

In her Angel series, Cui featured a pregnant Asian woman with porcelain skin and rosy cheeks in a “virginal” white dress. Since pregnancy of young unmarried girls is considered taboo in China, this series makes social commentary about the double standards and treatment of women in China.

Building on earlier themes of sexuality, society, and the female body, Cui also created the One day in 2004 works in 2005. This series of autobiographical works featured adolescent girls adorned with cultural-revolution inspired red scarves in digitally manipulated locations of the Forbidden City.

Most of Cui's work incorporated traditional Chinese scroll paintings, in which the natural landscape beauty is more important than the people.

Sanjie (2003) at the Hirshhorn Museum and Sculpture Garden in 2022

Sanjie is Cui's remake of Leonardo da Vinci's Last Supper, in which all thirteen characters are played by the same girl, with a red scarf around her neck, in order to represent communist themes.

Cui's major exhibitions include: Reincarnation, Shanghai Gallery of Art, Shanghai, China (2014); The Love of Soul, Today Art Museum, Beijing, China (2014); Inspired by the Opera: Contemporary Chinese Photography and Video, Smart Museum of Art, the University of Chicago, Chicago (2014); IU: You & Me, Suzhou Art Museum, Suzhou, China (2013); Spiritual Realm, Today Art Museum, Beijing, China (2010); Talk Statement, National Taiwan Museum of Fine Arts, Taipei, Taiwan; National Museum of China, Beijing, China (2009); Our Future: The Guy & Myriam Ullens Collection, UCCA, Beijing, China (2008); Floating – New Generation of Art in China, National Museum of Contemporary Art, Gwacheon, Korea (2007); The Thirteen: Chinese Video Now, MoMA PS1, New York, NY (2006); Untitled: Julia Loktev, Julika Rudelius, Cui Xiuwen, Tate Modern, London, UK (2004) and Alors, la Chine?, Centre Pompidou, Paris, France (2003).

Cui has received numerous awards and distinctions that have placed her among the most influential modern Chinese artists. In 1998, she received the Women in the Arts Society Award given by The Committee of “Century • Women” Art Exhibition. In 2008, she was awarded the Outstanding Female Artist Biennial Award from Shu-Fang Hsiao Art Foundation as well as the Shu-Fang Hsiao Art Fund Award for Outstanding Female Artist given by Wu Zuoren International Foundation of Fine Arts. In 2010, she was awarded the Youth Artist Award by Chinese Art Critic Annual. In the same year, Cui was the first woman to be distinguished by the Artists Association of China as an Art China Annual Influential Artist.

Cui Xiuwen died on 1 August 2018 following a long illness.

== See also ==
- Central Academy of Fine Arts
- Fabien Fryns Fine Art
- Cui Xiuwen interview with Yishu Journal of Contemporary Chinese Art
- Cui Xiuwen Interview with Ode to Art
- Cui Xiuwen on Death with Yishu Journal of Contemporary Chinese Art
