= Chen Ke =

Chen Ke may refer to:

- Chen Ke (basketball) (born 1979), Chinese basketball player
- Chen Ke (artist) (born 1978), Chinese artist
- Chen Ke (table tennis), Chinese table tennis player
