= N12 =

N12 may refer to:

== Roads ==
- N12 (South Africa)
- N12 road (Ghana)
- N12 road (Ireland)
- Nebraska Highway 12, United States
- Route nationale 12, France

== Other uses ==
- N12 (Art Group), China
- HMS Clyde (N12), a submarine of the Royal Navy
- N12, the website for Hevrat HaHadashot (the News division for the Israeli Channel 12)
- Interstitial nephritis
- Lakewood Airport, New Jersey, United States
- LNER Class N12, a class of British steam locomotives
- Nissan Pulsar (N12), a Japanese car
- Nitrogen-12, an isotope of nitrogen
- Nylon 12, a polymer
- N12, a postcode district in the N postcode area, North London, England

== See also ==
- 12N (disambiguation)
