= 12N =

12N may refer to:

- Aeroflex–Andover Airport, by FAA airport identification code
- 12th parallel north, a line of latitude
- Nitrogen-12 (^{12}N), an isotope of nitrogen

== See also ==
- N12 (disambiguation)
