= Lu Xinjian =

Chinese-born artist (born 1977)

Lu Xinjian (or Xinjian Lu) is a Chinese born contemporary artist known for producing paintings, sculpture, graphic art and design.

== Life and work ==
Lu was born in Yixing City, Jiangsu Province, China in 1977. He majored in computer graphic design and graduated from the Nanjing Arts Institute in 2000. He studied Interior and Industrial Design at the Postgraduate Department at the Design Academy Eindhoven, The Netherlands, in 2005 and received his MFA from the Interactive Media and Environment Department at the Frank Mohr Institute at Hanze University, The Netherlands in 2006. His exposure to Dutch artists of the Zero (art) and De Stijl movements and the museums while studying in The Netherlands influenced the visual aesthetic one can observe in his work today.

In 2009 he was introduced to the founder of ART LABOR Gallery, Shanghai, China and participated in two group shows with the gallery in 2010, including the "2nd Impressions" exhibition for the opening of their 2nd gallery space, featuring noted international artists such as Mustafa Hulusi, Mark Titchner and Suitman. He was also invited to participate in the 2nd Moscow International Biennale for Young Art by the respected Stella Art Foundation. These exhibitions were some of the first public exposures of his CITY DNA painting series.

Lu Xinjian's most well known series, City DNA, is "based on aerial photos sourced from Google Earth software." The artist "creates abstract paintings of major cities across the world in his series City DNA. What appears to be a mass of abstract shapes and colors, soon becomes a coherent view of the subject city, allowing the city's nuances and unique characteristics to shine through," states Juxtapoz. This series was first shown at ART LABOR Gallery, Shanghai in 2010, followed by Fabien Fryns Fine Art in Beijing and Los Angeles. Some pieces are in the White Rabbit Collection. One of his earlier and larger works, City DNA Shanghai No.3 (200x400cm) is in the DSL Collection.

In 2006 he won the Chaumont Studio Prize at the International Poster Festival in Chaumount, France. His works have been written about widely in Artforum (2011), DesignBoom, Beautiful Decay, Flavorwire, and Zilla Mag.

His work is presently on view in a solo exhibition "CITY DNA IV" at Hua Gallery, in London, England until October 2014. Lu Xinjian will launch a new series of paintings, "CITY STREAM" at ART LABOR Gallery, Shanghai, September 6, 2014. His latest artwork about living in Shanghai has been featured in Design Boom ree.

He currently lives and works in Shanghai.

== Solo exhibitions ==
2014 - "CITY STREAM", ART LABOR Gallery, Shanghai, China
2014 - "City DNA IV", Hua Gallery, London, England
2014 - "Lu Xinjian, Beautiful Encounters: Cities and Poems", 117 Art Center, Ningbo, China, Curated by ART LABOR Gallery, Shanghai.
2014 - "Wired Space - New sculpture", ART LABOR Gallery, Shanghai, China
2013 - "Between Abstraction and Reality, Lu Xinjian’s City DNA", ArtShare (online only)
2012 - "Invisible Poem II", F2 Gallery, Beijing, China
2012 - "Invisible Poem", ART LABOR Gallery, Shanghai, China
2011 - "City DNA III", Fabien Fryns Fine Art, Los Angeles, California
2011 - "City DNA II", CIGE 2011, Beijing, China
2011 - "City DNA II", F2 Gallery, Beijing, China
2010 - "City DNA", ART LABOR Gallery, Shanghai, China

== Group exhibitions ==
2014 - "艺作花园 ARTificial Garden", SWFC (Mori Corporation), Shanghai China
2014 - "The Temporary", ARTicle Gallery, Birmingham, UK
2013 - "I Love Shanghai", ART LABOR Gallery, Shanghai, China
2013 - "FILTER THE PUBLIC", SWFC, Shanghai, China
2013 - "Expressions Of My City", Lane Crawford Store Grand Opening Exhibition, Shanghai
2012 - "Distance and Dimension", Fernando Bordoni & Lu Xinjian, ART LABOR Gallery, Shanghai, China
2012 - "Re-animators", Meulensteen Gallery, NYC, USA
2012 - "The Year of Dragon", Chen Hangfeng & Lu Xinjian, Gallery Jones, Vancouver, Canada
2011 - "High 5", ART LABOR Gallery, Shanghai, China
2010 - "Basic Forms" by the Stella Art Foundation, 2nd Moscow International Biennale for Young Art, Russia
2009 - "Resemblance & Difference", Daegu Art Center, South Korea

== Art fairs ==
2014 - Art 14 Art Fair, London, Fabien Fryns Fine Art, London UK
2012 - F2 Gallery, Art Stage Singapore
2011 - ART LABOR Gallery Sh Contemporary 2011, ART LABOR Gallery, Shanghai, China
2011 - Solo Exhibition of works, City DNA II, CIGE 2011, with F2 Gallery, Beijing, China
2011 - F2 Gallery, Art Stage, Singapore
2010 - ART LABOR Gallery, Sh Contemporary 2010, Shanghai, China

== Art events and commercial projects ==
2014 - "City - Neighbor", Adidas Originals flagship store relaunch, Shanghai, China
2011 - "ABSOLUT Blank", ABSOLUT Vodka, Shanghai, China
2010 - "City DNA", Maison Pourcel by Jacques & Laurent Pourcel with ART LABOR Gallery, Shanghai, China

== See also ==
- Fabien Fryns Fine Art
