= Sun Liangang =

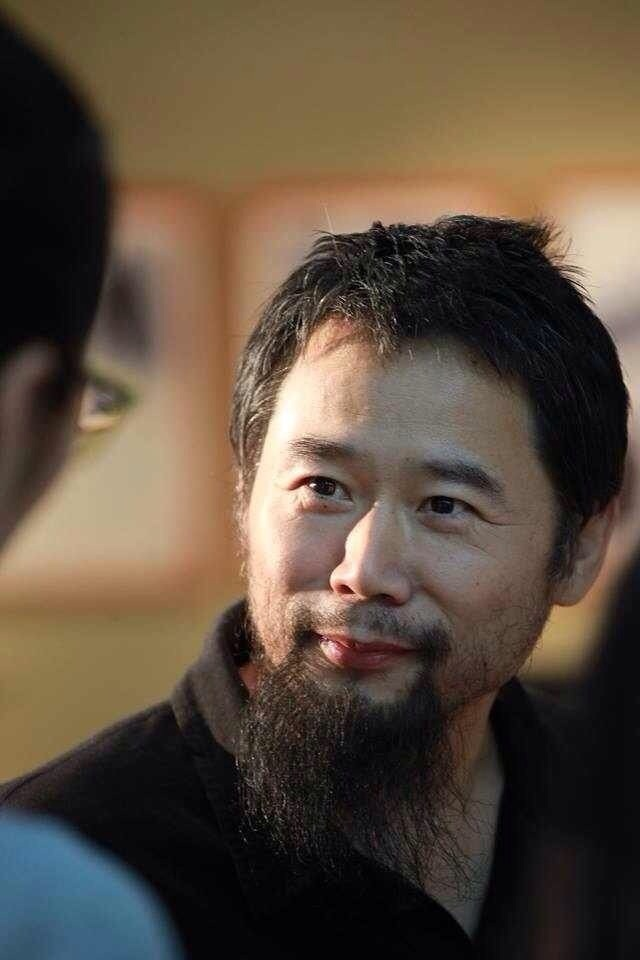
- Born: 28 January 1969 (age 57); Beijing, China
- Awards: Great Contribution Award, World Peace Award Art Competition May 2002

Sun Liangang
- Chinese: 孙连刚
Transcriptions
Standard Mandarin
- Hanyu Pinyin: Sūn Lián Gāng
- Wade–Giles: Sun^{4} Lian^{4}gang^{4}
- IPA: [swə̂nljɛ̂nkâŋ]

Liangang Sun (Chinese: 孙连刚; born January 28, 1969, in Beijing, China), is a Chinese contemporary artist. He is the initiator of contemporary Ideographism, director of Chinese Artists Association, and Curator of Caochangdi Art District.

== Sun Liangang with Caochangdi Art District ==
Liangang Sun is the founder of Caochangdi Art District. He positioned Caochangdi on a more experimental and more academic level. Sun dedicates to develop Caochangdi to assist young artists while considering less the commercial factors. For instance, the “Zero Capital Policy” provides young artists platforms that bringing them into public.

== Exhibition ==
=== Sun's Paintings ===
Date: 2008
Venue: Louvre
Artist: Sun Liangang

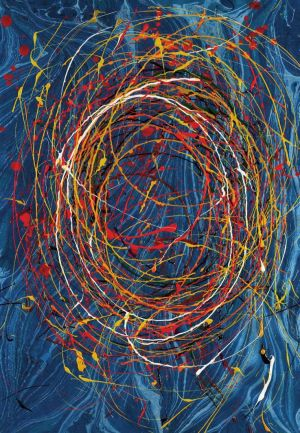
One of Sun Liangang's Paintings exhibited at Musée du Louvre in 2008

=== China Contemporary Poet Art Exhibition ===
Date: May 19, 2008 - May 25, 2008
Venue: Asia Art Funds
Artist: Bi Jianxun, Chen Yu, Dao Zi, Duo Duo, Lao Che, Mang Ke, Ouyang Jianghe, Song Lin, Sun Lian'gang, Wang Wangwang, Wang Ai, Xi Chuan, Xiao Xiao, Yan Li, Yang Dian, Yu Xinqiao, Zhong Ming

=== From Here To Eternity ===
Date: Nov 3, 2011 - Jan 1, 2012
Venue: Hai Gallery, Beijing, China
Artists: Sonia Falcone, Sun Liangang

=== Oriental Ideographism ===
Date: Dec 8, 2012 - Dec 30, 2012
Venue: FYR Gallery, Florence, Italy
Artist: Sun Liangang

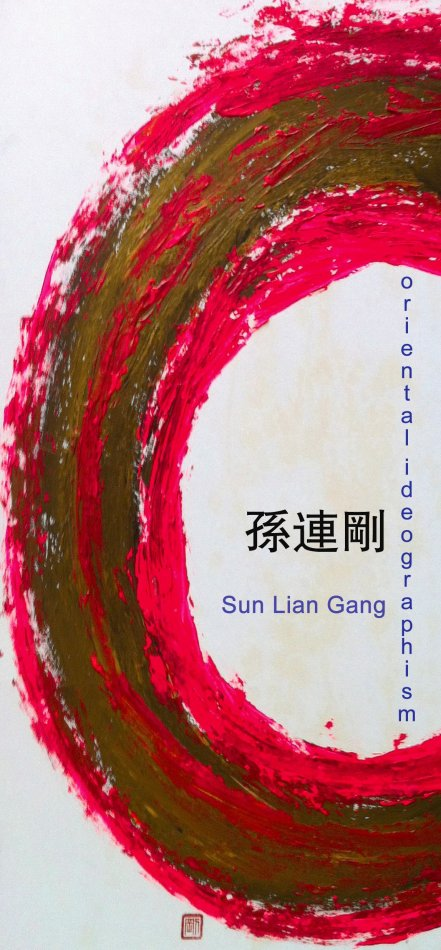
Sun Liangang's Art Gallery exhibited in Florence, Italy

=== Sun's Sculpture ===
Date: Dec 2013
Venue: Sun Art Center, New York City, USA
Artist: Sun Liangang

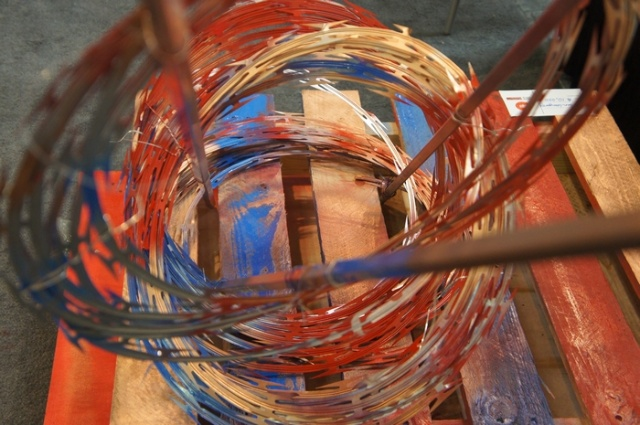
Sun Liangang's Sculpture exhibited at New York in 2013
