= F2 Gallery =

Contemporary art gallery in China

F2 Gallery was a contemporary art gallery in Beijing, China founded by art dealer Fabien Fryns. Established in 2005, the gallery is located in the Caochangdi Art District and held exhibitions by both Western and Chinese contemporary artists, including Henry Hudson, Sheng Qi, Wu Junyong and Zeng Fanzhi. The gallery's first opening included the high-profile artists Julian Schnabel and Jean-Michel Basquiat.

In 2012, Fryns closed the F2 Gallery in Beijing along with another gallery in LA, in order to focus on other cross-cultural connection projects.

== See also ==
- Caochangdi
