= Chen Ke (artist) =

Chinese artist

- Born: Tongjiang County, Sichuan, China
- Known for: Painting, drawing, sculpture, Fashion
- Notable work: Artist
- Awards: Chinese New Painting Award
- Website: http://artand.cn/ck

Chen Ke (simplified Chinese: 陈可; traditional Chinese: 陳可; pinyin: Chén Kě, born 1978 in Tongjiang, Sichuan, China) is a Chinese artist. She currently lives and works in Beijing. Having participated in numerous international and domestic exhibitions, Chen Ke has worked in a variety of media, including painting, sculpture and fashion design. Chen Ke is recognized as the most representative artist of the New Generation of Cartoon of China.

== Background ==
Chen Ke was born in Tongjiang, Sichuan Province of China. When Chen Ke needed to select her major in the university, she read a book about Vincent Van Gogh. She was deeply touched by the story of Van Gogh and decided to major in oil painting. It was at this moment that she came up with the thought of becoming an artist. Following her graduation from Sichuan Fine Arts Institute in 2002, she succeeded in getting her master's degree in oil painting in the same institute in 2005. Later, she came to Beijing with her husband to seek her dream of becoming an artist.

Chen Ke thought all of her paintings were part of her memories at that moment. The paintings in the exhibition in 2007 were special to her because they represented her whole childhood, and her parents helped her to find the old things which appeared in her childhood. She left home when she finished her junior high school, so the home in her childhood seems to be far away from her, and every time what she dreamed was her childhood home. Therefore, she wanted to copy her childhood home in Beijing. In her first two years in Beijing, she felt lonely and what she could do was to paint and put her moods into the painting. She believed this is the reason why many people think that the girl in her painting was actually Chen Ke. And the girl in her painting grew up with the growth of Chen Ke. She thought she was lucky that she could cooperate with the Gallery after graduation. She joined many events with different zones of people because she wanted art to be linked with different people. She believed her art appeared from her daily life, so she hoped art could enter the daily lives of people. She thought fashion and art have no differences at the top point.

== Artworks ==
Chen Ke first showed her works in the 'Self-image: Women in the Arts in China (1920–2010)' in 2001. And since then, she has been active in publishing her works in various magazines and books. In 2008, Chen Ke devoted to the 'Beyond dimension - China New Painting', which played an important role for her. Up to now, she is still making contributions to the art world and publishing more eye-catching art.

As classical artworks of Chen Ke, almost every piece of work shows a little girl with a round nose, who is lost in depression, limited to herself, living in an unreal space, and seems to keep a distance from the human world. Usually, the sad girl takes up the center of the whole artwork. With the full expression of the blank as well as the grain like porcelain painting, Chen Ke fully shows the opposition of the reality, which buries the audience in the waves of the sense of unknown sadness.

For Chen Ke, the trials on the painting media never stop its moving steps. Among the works completed in 2008, Chen Ke came up with some new ideas and made the painting just like manual, complementarity of calico with the painting mediator as well as the traditional oil painting materials are expressed to a large degree, making the sad girl changeable and seems to be jumping between the virtual world and the reality, which makes the audience lost in the endless loneliness and long distraction.

Like many young artists, Chen Ke takes her interest in various aspects - music, traveling, and reading are her favorites. In addition, she is also addicted to the analyses of the constellations, which also make a contribution to the sense of mystery in her works. Chen Ke uses painting to fill her life and express herself in her paintings. It is stated that she would be buried in a sense of constellation nothingness if she stops painting for a whole day. Chen likes challenges and is always seeking the power for achievements to satisfy her needs to be superior to herself and to seek a sense of herself. For Chen Ke, this achievement becomes more real and exciting than just remaining still and waiting for death.

Similar to her 2007 Star Gallery exhibition, which utilized furniture to evoke childhood memories, Chen Ke’s subsequent work explores self-recreation. Through the flow of the trace of colors and the position of the girls, she expressed her sense of belongingness and her feeling about herself.

== Works ==
=== Publication ===
In 2007, Chen Ke published a book of autobiography and paintings entitled "和你在一起，永远不孤单", 'Being with you and I will never feel lonely'. In this book, she told her story from being a little girl in a small city of Sichuan to becoming the most representative contemporary Chinese artist. And she also shared the memories that belong to the people of the 1970s. And her paintings have been included in both international and domestic books on art, including China - Facing Reality (2007), Avatars and Antiheroes: A Guide to Contemporary Chinese Artists (2008), and 19 Samples of Chinese Contemporary Female Artists (2008).

=== Fashion ===
Chen Ke has cooperated with many fashion brands. In 2008, Fendi invited Chen Ke to join the Fendi special handbags Baguette Anniversary commemorative edition series; she designed a handbag for the series. In 2014, Chen Ke designed for the Vogue FNO series to celebrate the ninth anniversary of Vogue magazine.

=== Technology ===
In 2015, Chen Ke designed 5 phone cases for the Jianguo phone of the Smartisan Technology Co., Ltd.

== Exhibitions ==
Chen Ke had her sole show in Star Gallery, Kunsthaus Viernheim and Marella Gallery. Her artworks also have been exhibited in many other galleries in London, Berlin, Vienna, Bangkok, Beijing, Shanghai, Nanjing etc.

=== Solo exhibitions ===
2007:

- With You, I Will Never Feel Lonely, Marella Gallery, Milan, Italy; Star Gallery, Beijing, China.

2008:

- Personal War, Star Gallery, Beijing, China.

2009:

- Another Me in the World, Viernheim, Germany.

2010:

- Hard-Boiled Wonderland and the End of the World, Star Gallery, Beijing, China.

2012:

- With You, I Will Never Feel Lonely, Star Gallery, Beijing, China.

2021:

- BAUHAUS GAL - ROOM, Galerie Perrotin, Shanghai, France.

2023:

- BAUHAUS GAL - THEATRE, Galerie Perrotin, Paris, France.

=== Group exhibitions ===
2001:

- First Chengdu Biennale Special Exhibition of Students won Rookie of the Year Award, Museum of Contemporary Art Chengdu, Chengdu, China.
- 'Nightmare·people and Doll' Photography exhibition, Chengdu, China.
- 'Rotation360---the 6th China Programme Art Exhibition' Chinese Contemporary Art Literature Exhibition, Shanghai, China.

2002:

- Floating Dream---the Contemporary Art Photography and Video from Southwest China, HongKong, China.
- 'Pingyao International Photography Festival' China New Photography Festival, Pingyao, China.
- 'Attention' Video and Photography Exhibition, Chongqing, China.

2003:

- 'ListeningMen's Stories told by women' Conceptual Art Exhibition, Chongqing, China.
- 'Direction' Experimental oil painting exhibition, Chongqin, China
- 'Youth is power' Youth Art Exhibition, Shanghai, China
- The 2nd Guiyang Oil Painting Biennale Young Female Artist Joint Exhibits, Guiyang, China

2004:

- 'Blue Space' Academic Invited Exhibition Chengdu, China

2005:

- 'Next Station, Cartoon?', Hexiangning Art Museum, Shenzhen, China; Star Gallery, Beijing, China
- Future Archaeology---the 2nd China Art Triennale, Nanjing Museum, Nanjing, China
- Sight: Century and heaven---the 2nd Chengdu Biennalel, Chengdu Century City New International Convention and Exhibition Center. Chengdu, China
- The Self-Made Generation---Retrospective of New Chinese Painting, Shanghai Zendai moma, Shanghai, China

2006:

- Sky of bad boy, Star Gallery, Beijing, China
- Original: the new century of anime's aesthetics, MoCA, Shanghai, Shanghai, China
- Beyond Experience: New China, Arario Gallery, Beijing, China
- New Interface-up-Landing of New Generation, Red Bridge Gallery & Liu Haili Art Gallery, Shanghai, China
- Women in the bisexual community, Tang Contemporary Art Centre, Bangkok, Thailand

2007:

- Face the reality, Museum Moderner Kunst Stiftung Ludwig Wien (mumok), Vienna, Austria
- 'Your View, My Story', Berlin, Germany
- Chen ke, Li Jikai, Wei ji, Thomas Erben Gallery, New York, America
- 'Floating---New Generation of Art in China', National Museum of Contemporary Art (South Korea), Seoul, South Korea
- Starting From Southwest---Southwest Contemporary Art Exhibition 1985–2007, Guangdong Museum of Art, Guangzhou, China
- Sweet and sour generation---Chinese New Art, Kunstverein, Mannheim, Germany
- The First Chapter of Comparison and Exceeding: Acrossing---Contemporary Art and Design, Contrasts Gallery, Beijing, China

2008:

- One man's War---Chen Ke individual art exhibition, Star Gallery, Beijing, China
- Beyond Cartoon-Asian Contemporary Art Group Show, Beyond Art Space, Beijing, China
- New InterfaceIV-Spring is coming, Red Bridge Gallery, Shanghai, China
- In the Mood for Paper, F2 Gallery, Beijing, China
- Deep Breath-Chinese Contemporary Female Art Exhibition, Greek Art, Shanghai, China
- Chen Ke, Marella Gallery, Milan, Italy
- Couples in Contemporary Art, MOCA Shanghai, Shanghai, China
- Looking For Me, Mingsheng Center for Contemporary Art, Shanghai, China
- The 2nd Shanghai MoCA Envisage: Butterfly, MOCA Shanghai, Shanghai, China
- Free China---BSI Swiss Foundation collection exhibition, Lugano, Switzerland
- Face the Reality---Contemporary Art, National Art Museum of China, Beijing, China

2009:

- China: the Contemporary Rebirth, Palazzo Reale, Milan, Italy
- Weaving a Chinese Dream Chinese elements in New Contemporary Art, Star Gallery, Beijing, China
- From Zero to Hero-Yangzi Apartment & Star Gallery, Star Gallery, Beijing, Shanghai
- Another me in the World, Kunsthaus Viernheim, Berlin, Germany
- Take you to China International Gallery Exposition, China World Trade Centre, Beijing, China
- The Mood For Paper, F2 Gallery, Beijing, China

2010:

- Self Image-Woman Art in China (1920–1020), The Art Museum of China Central Academy of Fine Arts, Beijing, China
- And Writers-the 1st Nanjing biennale, Jiangsu Art Museum, Nanjing, China
- Franks - Suss Collection Show, Saatchi Gallery, London, England
- The official opening of Minsheng Art Museum-the Thirty Years of Chinese Contemporary Art, Minsheng Art Museum, Shanghai, China
- Reshaping the history-Chinart from 2000 to 2009, China National Convention Center, Beijing, China
- Beyond Fashion- the 1st Crossover Between Young Chinese Fashion designers and Young Chinese Artists, Beyond Art Space, Beijing, China
- Hard-Boiled Wonderland and the End of the World, Star Gallery, Beijing, China

2011:

- Daybreak, Arario Gallery, Cheonan, South Korea
- 'Shanshui-Poetry without Sound?' Landscape in Chinese Contemporary Art - Works from Sigg Collection, Kunstmuseum Lucerne, Lucerne, Switzerland
- Extract the 3rd Stall Keeper Show, C5 Art, Beijing, China

2012:

- China-Xinjiang the 1st Contemporary Art Biennale, Xinjiang International Art Exhibition Center, Xinjing, China
- Spin-the First Decade of New Century, Today Art Museum, Beijing, China Liberation, Star gallery, Beijing, China
- Artdepot at SH Contemporary 2012, Shanghai Exhibition Center, Shanghai, China
- "Non bound"- Print Exhibition, +86 Design Museum, Beijing, China
- Face, Minsheng Art Museum, Shanghai, China

2013:

- Criss-Cross ArtWork of Chinese Young Chinese Contemporary Artists From Long Collection, Long Museum, Shanghai, China
- Anti-GM, Tang Contemporary Art, Beijing, China
- The Talk in Woodblock, Bridge Gallery Contemporary Woodblock Art Group Exhibition, Bridge Gallery, Beijing, China
- Uneasy Trip in Asia Stage1, Star Gallery, Beijing, China
- Exhibition for Nominated Young Artists in Asia, Today Art Gallery, Beijing, China
- Freda-a Woman Chen ke Exhibition, Hong Kong Convention and Exhibition Center, Hong Kong, China

2014:

- Uneasy Trip in Asia Stage2 2014, Star Gallery, Beijing, China
- Chengdu Blue Roof Art Festival, Blue Roof Museum of Chengdu, Chengdu, China
- "To the youth - our young age" Young Artists Group Exhibition, Shanghai Hwas' Gallery, Shanghai, China

2015:

- It's Not Right But It's Okay, Ullens Center for Contemporary Art, Beijing, China
- Cover-Chenke Recent Works, Star Gallery, Beijing, China
- Art Taichung, Millennium Vee Hotel Taichung, Taichung, China Taiwan
- Group Exhibition 'Spring' Chen ke, Liu Aijing, Zheng Dongmei, Red Gate Gallery, Beijing, China

2016:

- Chinese Whispers-Chinese Contemporary Art Collection Exhibition, Kunstmuseum Bern and Zentrum Paul Klee, Switzerland

2017:

- Reading the Raindrops—The Western China Artists Documenta, MOCA Yinchuan Gallery, Yinchuan, China

2021:

- Chinese Contemporary Art from the Yuz Foundation, Los Angeles County Museum of Art, Los Angeles, USA

2022:

- The First Beijing Biennial, Beijing, China

== Collection ==
- Museum Voorlinden, Netherlands
- The Franks-Suss Collection, London, UK
- The Sigg Collection, Lucerne, Switzerland
- BSI Art Foundation, Switzerland
- Lorenzo Sassoli de Bianchi, Italy
- White Rabbit Collection, Australia
- Shenzhen Art Museum, Shenzhen, China
- Long Museum, Shanghai, China
- Yuz Museum Shanghai, Shanghai, China
- Minsheng Art Museum, Shanghai, China

== Recognition ==
Chen Ke has received a lot of awards, including the 3rd Chinese New Painting Award (中国新锐绘画奖) and Nomination for " Young Artist of the Year 2008" by Award of Art China (艺术中国·年度青年艺术家).

== Publication ==
Ke, Chen, 'With you and I will never feel lonely' <和你在一起，永远不孤单>, Beijing: China Youth Publishing House, 2012. ISBN 9787515305684
