= Feng Shu =

Chinese artist from Beijing

Feng Shu is a Chinese artist from Beijing who produces detailed skull and insect sculptures made from intricate hand-painted ceramic and steel.

== Life and work ==
Shu was born in Beijing, China in 1981. He studied sculpture at the prestigious Central Academy of Fine Arts for both his Bachelor of Fine Arts (2005) and Masters of Fine Arts (2009).

An artist in the 1980s generation of Chinese artists, his detailed painted ceramic and steel skulls and insects have been released in the “Beautiful Bugs Series.” In an interview, Shu stated his inspiration comes from growing up as an only child because of the one-child policy in China, "so it was a little lonely and boring. As a child, I was always outside looking for insects to play with."

His works have been shown worldwide at F2 Gallery (Fabien Fryns Fine Art), The Opposite House Beijing, and CIGE. They have been sold at international auctions and are in major collections.

In 2010 Feng Shu completed an installation at the Tai Wai MTR Station in Hong Kong. His work was shown at Art14 in London in 2014.

He lives and works in Beijing.

== See also ==
- Central Academy of Fine Arts
- Fabien Fryns Fine Art
