= Zheng Lu =

Chinese artist

Zheng Lu (郑路) (born 1978 in Inner Mongolia, China) is an artist based in Beijing. Zheng Lu studied at Lu Xun Fine Arts Academy from 1998 to 2003 before continuing to Beijing's Central Academy of Fine Arts from 2004 until 2007. While still in school, Zheng won the LVMH Prize, which provided the artist with three months training at the École nationale supérieure des Beaux-Arts (ENSBA) in Paris. Zheng has mainly produced sculpture and installation work with steel structure, and also two-dimensional, multimedia, stage and public art.

Zheng Lu's first solo exhibitions were in Beijing, starting in 2009 at New Age Gallery with "Interpreting Nonexistence." In 2010 at F2 Gallery, Zheng had a showing of sculptures titled, "Zheng Lu: Object Distance." That year Zheng also showed "Constellations Shen and Shang," at J Art in Shanghai. In 2011 Zheng had a solo show "Passage of Time" at Schoeni Art Gallery, Hong Kong and then "Bow Without an Arrow," at MOT/ARTS in Taipei. His most recent solo exhibition was "Water from Water," at Shanghai Gallery of Art. In October 2015, ZHENG Lu's solo exhibition, “SHIOSAI”, was on view in Museum of Contemporary Art, Taipei, Taiwan(MOCA, TAIPEI). In 2016, his “Transition” and “Re-sist-ance” was respectively exhibited in Parkview Museum, Beijing, and Long Museum, Shanghai, China. Zheng has gradually formed and improved his own aesthetic logic and vocabulary. Through incorporating into art material, scripts, water, time, space, and other relevant concepts, he developed his unique style in art.
