= Galerie Urs Meile, Beijing-Lucerne =

Contemporary art gallery

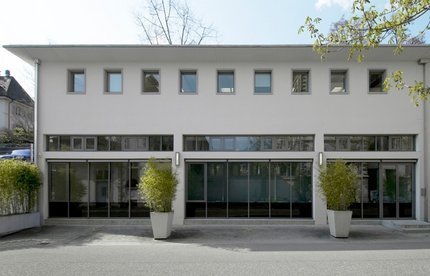
Galerie Urs Meile, Beijing-Lucerne; Lucerne branch.

Galerie Urs Meile, Beijing-Lucerne (Chinese: 麦勒画廊) is a contemporary art gallery located in Lucerne (Switzerland) and Beijing (China).

== History and artistic programme ==
The gallery was founded by Urs Meile (the son of an art collector) in 1992.

Its Beijing gallery opened in 2006 and was originally located in Caochangdi, but in May 2017 it opened a new space in a former warehouse in the 798 Art District.

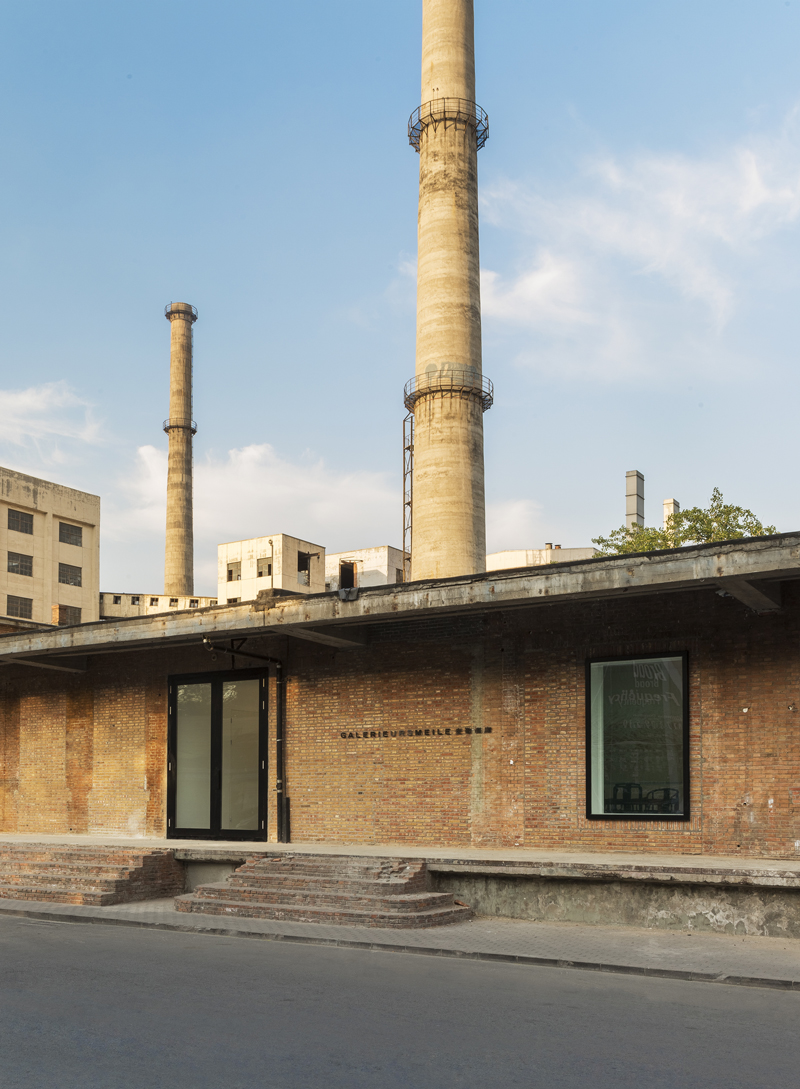
Galerie Urs Meile, Beijing-Lucerne; Beijing branch.

Galerie Urs Meile participates at Art Basel, Art Basel Hong Kong, and Art Basel Miami Beach.
