= Shen Jingdong =

Chinese artist (born 1965)

Shen Jingdong 沈敬东
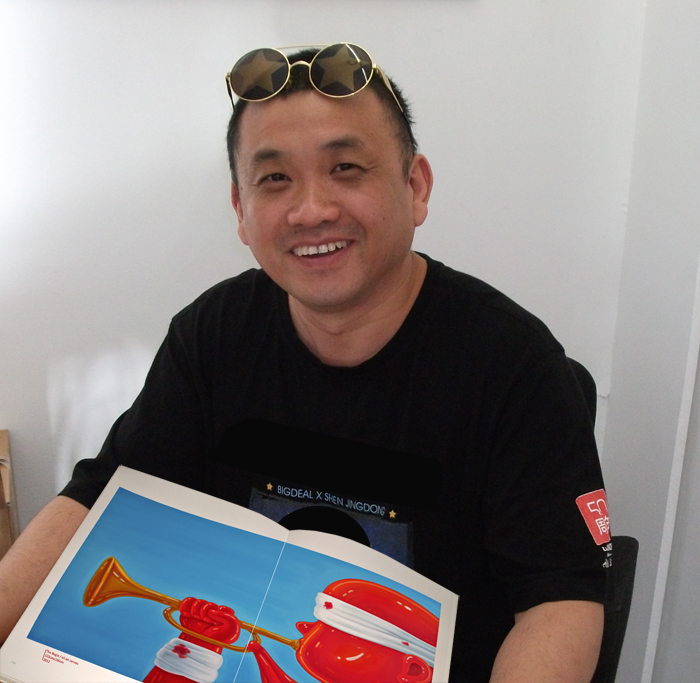
- Shen at a public exhibition in France
- Born: 1965 (age 60–61); Nanjing, Jiangsu, China
- Known for: Painting, Sculpting
- Movement: Contemporary (new wave)
- Website: https://www.shenjingdong.org

Shen Jingdong (born 1965) is a contemporary Chinese artist whose work focuses on Chinese iconography through paintings and sculptures. He is based in Beijing, China.

== Life and career ==
Shen Jingdong was born in Nanjing, China, in 1965. He graduated from Nanjing Xiaozhuang Normal School in 1984 and later received a degree from the Nanjing Arts Institute in 1991. From 1991 to 2007, he worked at the Military Drama Troupe of the Nanjing Military Area.

In 2006, his painting Hero No. 12 entered the collection of the National Art Museum of China.

His Hero series, which began in 2008, gained recognition in China and abroad. The series depicts soldiers and cultural figures using bright colors such as blue, green, red, and yellow.

Actress Zhang Ziyi owns some of his works.

In 2013, Three Great Men sold for £154,000 at the Beijing Googut Auction, setting his auction record at the time. The same piece was resold at Sotheby's in 2018.

== Exhibitions ==
=== Selected exhibitions ===
Exhibitions include:

2021

- Blooming flowers and full moon, Beiqiu Art Museum, Nanjing
- Best Role, Solo Exhibition, Diyuan Art Museum, Jiaxing

2020

- Shen Jingdong: The Beautiful Fairy Tales, Asia House, London, UK
- Small eyes-big world, XSPACE Gallery, Nanjing, China

2019

- Art Design and Home, Red Star Macalline, Guiyang, China
- Shen Jingdong came here, Hôtel de l'industrie, Paris, France
- Shen Jingdong is here, Chinese Gallery, New York, USA
- Shen Jingdong was here, Il Giardino Bianco Art Space, Venice, Italy

2018

- From South to North in 2018—Shen Jingdong's Invitational Exhibition of Individual Works, Art Museum of School of Fine Arts and Design of Shenyang Normal University, China
- Start from Nanjing, Jinling Art Museum, Nanjing, China.
- Guns N'Roses—Shen Jingdong's Solo Exhibition, Parkview Green ART, Beijing, China

2017

- International Joke: Shen Jingdong, Ross Art Museum, Maryland, USA
- Art Career Record of Good Soldier Jingdong: Shen Jingdong Literature Exhibition, Songzhuang Contemporary Art Documentary Exhibition, Beijing China
- Shen Jingdong Story: Shenjingdong, Art and Design Academy Art Museum, Yanshan University, Qinhuangdao, China

2016

- International Joke: Shen Jingdong Solo Exhibition, Korean Craft Museum, Cheongju, Republic of Korea
- Shen Jingdong and Jon Tsoi: No head No heart, WhiteBox, New York City, USA
- Let's Paint Together: Shen Jingdong and Liao Mingming Collaborative Exhibition, Yue Museum of Art, Beijing, China
- New Representational Art in China, Hudson Center for Contemporary Arts, Poughkeepsie, USA

2015

- The Little Prince, E Space, Hong Kong
- Dawn of a New Age: Ink Redefined, Art Futures Gallery, Hong Kong
- Censure, Galerie Dock Sud, Sète, France

2014

- My Kingdom of Fairytales, Art Futures Group, ArtOne, Hong Kong
- Hidden Meanings, Colour Explosion, Today Art Museum, Beijing, China
- Art Paris - Art Fair, "France-Chine 50" (la Chine à l'honneur), France

2013

- Art Basel - Miami Beach, Exhibition Miami FL, États-Unis
- Art Basel - Hong Kong, Exhibition China
- New Art Fair, Espace Pierre Cardin, Paris, France

2012

- ST-ART, Foire Internationale d'art contemporain, Strasbourg, France

2011

- Continue with Revolution, 3V Gallery, Nanjing, China
- East/west: Visually Speaking, Frost Art Museum, Miami, FL, United States

2010

- Chasing Flames - Chinese Group Show - Zadok Art Gallery, Miami, FL
- Lille Art Fair, Foire internationale d'art contemporain, Lille, France
- State of the Dao: Chinese Contemporary Art - Lehman College Art Gallery, New York City, NY
- "RESHAPING HISTORY Chinart from 2000 to 2009″ China National Convention Center Beijing, China

2009

- Hero, Volta Art Fair, New York, USA, (solo)
- Tension at Poles – Invitational Exhibition of Works of Masters from Beijing, Shanghai and Chengdu, Luodai Town, Chengdu, China
- Trust – Exhibition of Contemporary Painting, Star Factory Art Center, Beijing, China
- Context – Invitational Exhibition of Contemporary Painting, Beijing Foundery Museum of Art, China
- Memory of China – Exchange Exhibition of Chinese and Spanish Artists' Works, Time Space in 798 Factory, Beijing, China
- Strength of Practice, the Third Documenta of Contemporary Chinese Prints, Nanjing Museum, China
- Red Memory, Liu Haisu Art Museum, Shanghai, China
- China-Korean Exchange Exposition, 798 Yan Gallery, Beijing, China
- Invitational Exhibition of Experimental Contemporary Arts, Museum of Contemporary Art, Songzhuang, Beijing, China
- Chengdu Biennale, New International Convention & Exposition Center, Chengdu, China
- Visual Presentation of Identity, Shanghai Duolun Museum of Modern Art, Shanghai, China

2008

- Heroes - ChinaSquare, New York (solo)
- The Most Beloved People, Today Art Museum & New Millennium Gallery, Beijing, China (solo)
- Multiple Perspectives – Exhibition of 11 Chinese Contemporary Artists' Works, Beijing You Gallery, Beijing, China
- Assembling under the Five Rings, Legend Hotel, Beijing, China
- Up North – Exhibition of Jiangsu Artists' Works, Egret Art Center, Beijing, China
- Up North, Down South, Art for All Society, Beijing, China
- Post-Modern Expression of Red Classics, Dong. Coffee. Event in 798 Art Zone, Beijing, China
- Strength of Practice – the Second Documents of Contemporary Chinese Prints, Nanjing Museum, China
- Drifting – China – Korean Exchange Exposition, Top Gallery, 798 Art Zone, Beijing, China

2007

- Making Heroes for ten years, Beijing Imagine Gallery, China (solo)
- We Could Be Heroes – Shen Jingdong solo exhibition, Hong Kong Yan Gallery (solo)
- Progressive Action, Beijing Millennium Time Gallery, China
- Body ? Impression – The Human Body in Contemporary Chinese Art, Red Gate Gallery, 798 Art Zone, Beijing, China
- Revolution, China Square Gallery, New York, USA
- Tie – Path, You Gallery, Beijing, China
- The Fourth China International Art Gallery expo, Beijing National Trade Center, China

2006

- Images of Heroes, New Millennium Gallery, Beijing, China
- Exhibition of One Painting, 88 Art Document Storehouse, Beijing, China

=== Public collections ===
The following public collections include Shen's work:

- 2019 – Hello, Van Gogh, acrylic on canvas, 80 × 60 cm, French Industrial Palace, Paris, France
- 2018 – The Little Prince, oil on canvas, 100x100cm. Jinling Art Museum, China
- 2014 – Salute, Stainless Steel, 200 cm high. Bengbu University, China
- 2013 – Salute, Stainless steel, 200 cm high. Xiamen Jimei University, China
- 2013 – Soldier with a Gun, Cast bronze, 200 cm high. Xiamen Jimei University, China
- 2012 – Salute, Cast bronze, 170 cm tall. Nanjing Art Institute, China
- 2009 – Hero, oil on canvas, 100 cm × 100 cm. WURTH Art Museum, Spain
- 2008 – Harmony One, oil on canvas, 200 cm × 600 cm. Oberte Museum, Germany
- 2008 – Head of a Soldier, spray paint in glass-steel, 56 cm × 52 cm × 35 cm, Henan Art Museum, China
- 2007 – Heroes Series No.12, oil on canvas, 200 cm × 200 cm, National Art Museum of China, China
- 2007 – Heroes Series No.42, oil on canvas, 200 cm × 200 cm, Singapore Museum of Fine Arts, Singapore
- 2006 – Founding Ceremony, oil on canvas, 200 cm × 700 cm. Shanghai Art Museum No. 1, China

== See also ==
- Zhang Ziyi
- Yue Minjun
- Zhang Xiaogang
