= Henry Hudson (artist) =

British artist (born 1982)

The Contemporary Artist’s Progress: The Rise and Fall of Young Sen, Plate 6, 2013

Henry Hudson (born 1982, Bath) is a British artist who lives and works in London. He is best known for his use of Plasticine as his artistic medium in the creation of textured ‘paintings’. Hudson's most notable exhibition to date was The Rise and Fall of Young Sen – The Contemporary Artist’s Progress, which was shown at Sotheby's SI2 Gallery, London in May 2015. The exhibition consisted of ten large scale Plasticine paintings, depicting a contemporary version of William Hogarth's A Rake's Progress. According to The New York Times, all ten paintings were sold prior to the show opening.

== Biography ==
Hudson grew up in Yorkshire and attended Ampleforth College. He graduated from Central Saint Martins College of Art and Design in 2005 after taking a foundation degree at Chelsea College of Art and Design. His father is sculptor Richard Hudson.

== Artwork ==
Hudson makes paintings, sculpture, etchings and performance based work. For the past seven years, his medium of choice has been Plasticine. In The Telegraph newspaper Hudson explains “I did performance as a student, but when I left I was broke and looking to make things I could sell. I’ve always loved the impasto painters: Leon Kossoff, Frank Auerbach, anyone a bit gloopy. So Plasticine felt like something I could run with.”

In the New York Times Hudson was quoted as saying that “there are certain things you can do with Plasticine that you can’t do with paint.” Writer Laura K. Jones has said that Hudson's use of Plasticine creates paintings that look “more like oil paintings than oil paintings themselves” and the critic Richard Dormant has described Hudson as an “astonishing young painter.”.

Hudson's work is concerned with ideas of Britishness and contemporary culture. His most recent series, The Rise and Fall of Young Sen – The Contemporary Artist’s Progress, satirises social stereotypes and the vulgarity that can stem from wealth, frame and consumer culture. Dylan Jones wrote in GQ magazine: “the pictures are saturated with contemporary cultural references ‘satirising the absurdity of modern life, from political issues to social stereotypes and the contemporary art world’”. Hudson also often pays tribute other artists from history either through emulating their style or re-appropriating their compositions. Examples include Van Gogh, Hieronymus Bosch as well as William Hogarth.

=== A Rake Revisited ===
Hudson’s series, A Rake Revisited, which was shown at the Sir John Soane's Museum in London 2011, also appropriated Hogarth’s A Rake's Progress but with Hudson himself characterised as the main character, Tom Rakewell. The director of the museum at the time, Tim Knox, explained to Cassone magazine “There is a pervasive sense of fear that is even more tangible in Hudson’s Plasticine clad canvases than in the original paintings. His work both subverts and celebrates Hogarth’s originals, adding his own story to a work which has become enmeshed in our culture, part of our national consciousness. He embellishes and exaggerates and makes these images from nearly three centuries ago alive for us again, inviting us to look just as acutely at the state of our nation today.”

The artist Marc Quinn has said, “Hudson aligns himself with an irreverent and eccentric British tradition in art that is really the savior of it… it’s a lineage of non-conformity yet quintessentially British-ness that is unique… Hudson has reinvented this tradition in his visual, trembling, vibrating, sculpted paintings.”

The Director of Sotheby's SI2 gallery Fru Tholstrup described Hudson to Wall Street International as “one of the most innovative young artists working today”. She went on to say that “through his painterly application of Plasticine, Hudson has developed a truly unique artistic language”. Damien Hirst has described Hudson as “F***ing mad”.

== Collectors ==
Notable collectors of Hudson's work include Marc Quinn, Robert Hiscox, Jay Jopling, Mario Testino, Tim Jeffries, Tommy Hilfiger and Mark Hix. Hudson has also been photographed by photographers Gautier De Blonde for The Telegraph and David Bailey for GQ.

Hudson has had numerous solo and group shows in London, Beijing, Hong Kong, Singapore, Paris, New York, Miami and Milan at venues including TJ Boulting (formerly Trolley Gallery), Sir John Soane's Museum, 20 Hoxton Square, F2 Gallery, Christie's, 33 Portland Place, Fine Art Society and as part of the Hiscox Collection.

== Recent ==
In 2016 Hudson's exhibited at Carl Kostyál Gallery, London and Sotheby's SI2 gallery in New York. He was recently nominated from Pulse Miami Beach art prize for a series of Woodburytype prints.

Thames & Hudson published an 8-page profile on Hudson in the publication London Burning: Portraits from a Creative City by Maryam Eisler, where Henry paid tribute to the vices of Hogarth's Tom Rakewell. The last photograph in the series depicted Hudson lying naked on William Hogarth's grave in Chiswick, London.

In April 2015, Sotheby's published a feature on Henry Hudson in coordination with his show at Sotheby's S|2 Gallery titled, Henry Hudson: The Contemporary Artist's Progress - The Rise and Fall of Young Sen. In an essay about Hudson Nimrod Kamer described him as a 'champagne fascist'. In 2015 he was extensively interviewed by GQ Magazine, with Dylan Jones describing Hudson as an 'iconic' artist".

In March 2016 he was profiled by Flora Alexandra Ogilvy for The Gentleman's Journal magazine. In June 2020, during the COVID-19 pandemic, Hudson painted a mural in Roman Road, East London, touching on the coronavirus as well as Black Lives Matter and the controversial 5G antennas surrounding the area.

In December 2023, Hudson was mentioned on Interview Magazine, in a story about gallery owner Maria Bernheim .

Hudson currently lives and works in London.

== See also ==
- Fabien Fryns
