= Pékin Fine Arts =

Art gallery in Beijing established in 2005

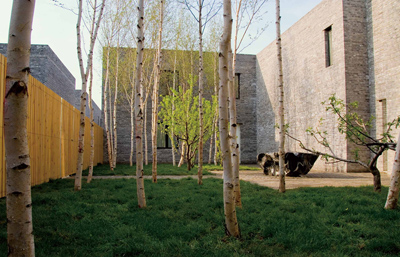
Pékin Fine Arts garden, Spring 2007

Pékin Fine Arts (Chinese: 北京艺门) is a contemporary art gallery in Beijing established in 2005, with a Hong Kong branch gallery opened in 2012. It was listed by The New York Times as one of the "top museums and galleries" in Beijing, and listed by Forbes as one of the ten galleries in Beijing from which to buy Chinese art.

== History ==
The gallery was established by Bostonian Meg Maggio (Chinese: 马芝安), a prominent contemporary art dealer. Maggio is a United States lawyer and member of the New York and Massachusetts bars, moved to Beijing in 1986, when, she said, "people thought it was like going to Mars". She lived there till 1990, then moved to Hong Kong, where she worked as an attorney first for Exxon Chemical, then for international British law firms, McKennas, and Sinclair Roche, advising United States, Asian and European clients. In 1995, Maggio moved back to Beijing to work as a senior attorney in the newly opened Beijing office of NY law firm Skadden, Arps, Slate, Meagher & Flom. From 1998 until 2006, she ran the Courtyard gallery in Beijing, one of the first galleries to open in China. She said in 2005, "The days when China and Chinese art were considered as just exotic are over."

In November 2005, Maggio established her own Pékin Fine Arts gallery and opened it in Caochangdi Village, which is on the northeastern edge of Beijing and has become a centre for art since leading artist, Ai Weiwei, opened a studio and gallery there in 2000 for himself and friends. Maggio said initially when Ai and his colleagues moved there, "We all thought they were cuckoo," as it was a place that was "basically the countryside—really far away." However, as the 798 District, the center of art in Beijing, attracted increasing numbers of tourists and boutiques, galleries began to move instead in Caochangdi Village, a quiet location lined by birch and pine trees. Pékin Fine Arts was set up in a complex designed by Ai of simple, low buildings, whose gray brick cladding is reminiscent of the traditional alleys (hutongs) found in old Beijing.

In March 2007, the gallery was part of the "internationally renowned line-up", including White Cube and Max Lang, at the first Gulf Art Fair, sponsored by the Dubai International Financial Centre. Pékin Fine Arts showed a solo display of abstracts by Chinese artist Aniwar, as well as "one of the biggest surprises" at the fair—a Mini Cooper car painted with colored spots by Damien Hirst and owned by Charles Saatchi; it was priced in the region of $2 million. A gallery associate, Irene Hochman, a "buying scout" for Saatchi, said, "We just brought it over to see what the interest is."

After returning from the fair, Maggio set off for New York to attend the contemporary Asian art sale at Sotheby's, accompanied by three artists and some Chinese clients; she that it had become a typical occurrence to be in Dubai one week, Beijing the following week, and New York the week after that. 73 out of 310 works at the auction failed to sell (they were "bought in"). Maggio said that the works were "by great artists, and, as far as I'm concerned, the only reason they were bought in was because the estimates were so high."

In May 2007, the Saatchi Gallery opened a Mandarin language web site for Chinese artists to show their work. Maggio said that an important aspect of the site was a chatroom and that the site was "a wonderful way to introduce Chinese artists to as many other artists and curators and students as possible around the world."

On 31 May 2007, Poly Auction Co held their inaugural sale in Beijing, 48 of the 65 contemporary works reaching or exceeding their high estimate, part of a pattern, where Chinese contemporary art had risen ten times in value within a year, but leading to accusations that the prices were "crazy" and part of a bubble market. Maggio, Poly Auction's foreign adviser, said that people could no longer expect to find "bargain shopping in the third world" and this was causing the negative response. She said that the highest prices at the Poly Auction sale were achieved by the "living father of Chinese modernism", Wu Guanzhong, then 85 years old, who had devoted his life to painting and deserved to achieve high prices.

In January 2008, the Voroduo installation by Boston architectural firm Office dA opened at Pékin Fine Arts in one of its main galleries. The installation was based on Voronoi mathematical diagrams and was made from 125 sheets of plastic, which were cut into 600 interlocking acrylic cells to form a structure twisted back on itself. Nadir Tehrani, a co-founder of Office dA, said he was not an artist and did not consider the piece to be art, but related to architectural practice and was calisthenics.

Two other exhibitions were being held at the same time in the gallery, linked, said Maggio, because "The artists are all working out problems—in terms of materiality and exploring the language of abstraction—and these works are the products of working out those problems." American painter and digital artist, Perry Hall, in Livepaintings exhibited videos of paint which had been modified by the application of chemicals; he also used sound waves to change the appearance of paint mixtures. Suling Wang, a London-based Taiwanese painter who has studied with Peter Doig, exhibited works on paper and large scale paintings, which combined aspects of the Chinese tradition of landscape with Western abstraction.

=== Clients and artists ===
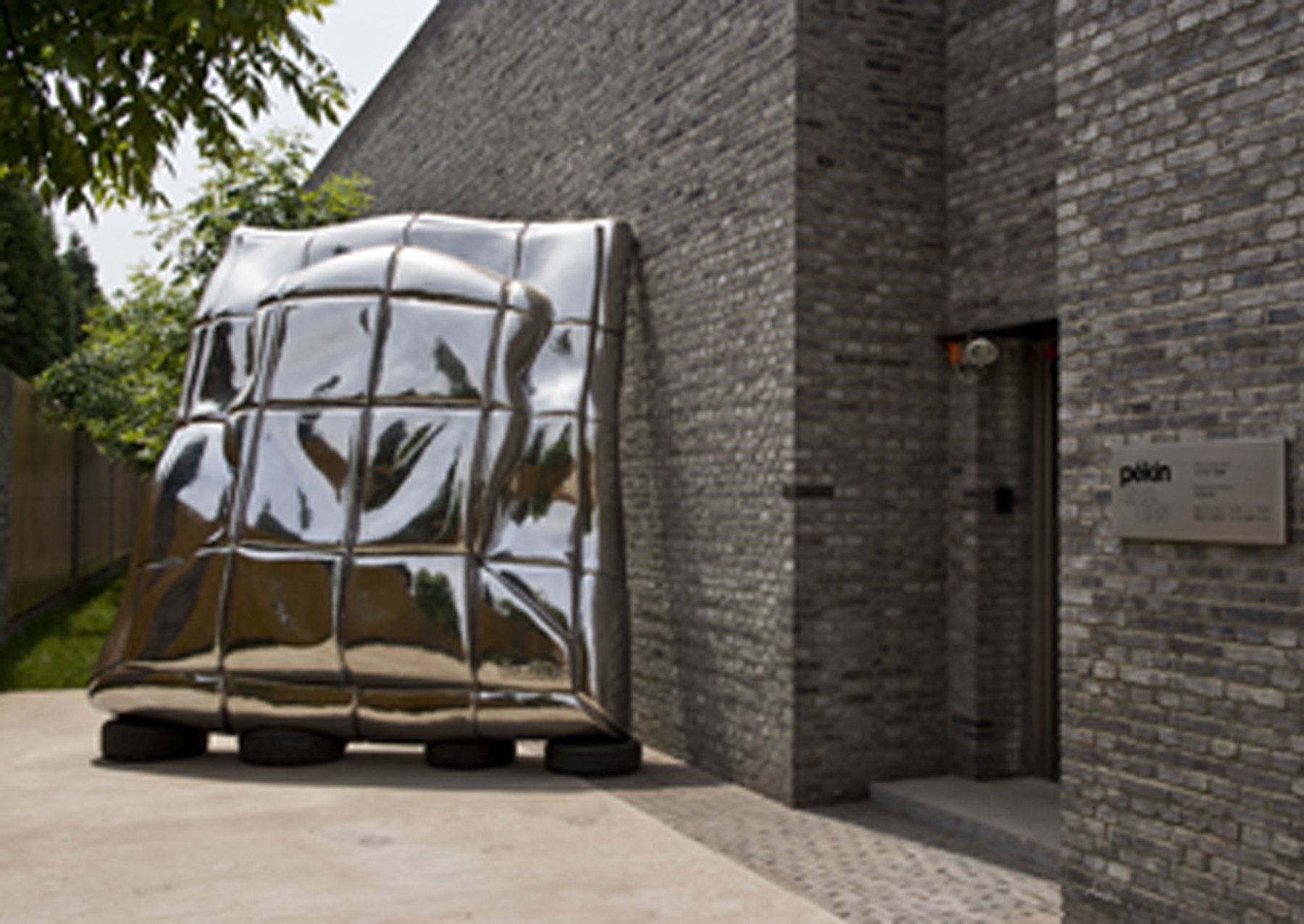
Pékin Fine Arts entrance with Wang Jin's artwork, 2009.

In August 2007, Maggio entertained a museum group at the South Silk Road restaurant in Soho New Town, one of six eating places opened by artist Fang Lijun for major collectors and curators from Seoul, Hong Kong and the West to meet the elite of the art world, over dishes such as caterpillar fungus chicken soup in steam pot. Maggio said, "China is a country where relationships are best built over a good meal."

Clients can be collectors from South Korea or European corporations who have business interests in China. Charles Saatchi is one of her clients. She said that Chinese clients have a strong interest in art from India, Korea and Singapore. Maggio is a consultant for the Gagosian Gallery. She sourced paintings by Li Songsong, Chen Wenji, and Ai An for Juan Van Wassenhove's apartment in the Sanlitun district of Beijing.

Maggio said that the Chinese market cannot now be easily distinguished from the Asian art market or the international art market in general, and that it can encompass Korean artists exhibiting in China and Chinese artists who live in New York. She said that Chinese art has evolved to encompass many varying ideas and aesthetics, and that it is "such a cliche to say that it is direct or too political." Pékin Fine Arts shows an international collection of artists; these include photographer Liu Zheng and O Zhang.

Pékin Fine Arts is located at 241 Caochangdi Village, Cuigezhuang Xiang.

Pékin Fine Arts recently expanded into Hong Kong, opening a second gallery space in Hong Kong's Wong Chuk Hang district.
