= Concept 21 =

Chinese artist collective of performance art

Concept 21 (Chinese: 觀念21), arguably the first artist collective of performance art in China, was formed in 1986 in Beijing by five students—Sheng Qi (盛奇), Zheng Yuke (鄭玉珂), Zhao Jianhai (趙建海), Kang Mu (康木), and Xi Jianjun (奚建軍).

== Formation ==
Concept 21 was formed in 1986 in Beijing. The group's inception began with 52 Hours of Unfolding Action, a collective performance which was executed on December 23, 1986. At the time, a group of students from Peking University organized a spontaneous art festival, and Sheng Qi invited his peers to orchestrate a performance at the campus of the university.

== Great Wall Performance ==
Enacted over the course of two days in May 1988, the collective executed a series of performances at the Great Wall of China by once again dressing in colourful strips of cloth around their bodies and head, similar to their attire in 52 Hours of Unfolding Action. The performance was divided into a number of stages in which the group engaged in various ritual-like actions. Shing-Kwan Chan argues that in this performance, the artists' body became at once a radical representation of the injustices of the past and of the contemporary individual grieving the injustices in the present.
