= N12 (art group) =

Chinese neo academism art group

N12, also called N to the power 12 (恩的十二次方), is a contemporary Chinese artist collective, established in 2003 in Beijing.The group was formed with the initial intention of creating a platform for its members to exhibit their artworks. N12 is among the most representative Chinese Neo-Academic art groups to emerge in China since the beginning of the 21st century. Members from N12 including Hu Xiaoyuan， Wang Guangle and Qiu Xiaofei, have become prominent emerging forces in contemporary Chinese art.

== Members ==
Wang Guangle, Hu Xiaoyuan, Qiu Xiaofei, Hao Qiang, Wang Jie, Yang Jing, Song Kun, Shen Liang, Xu Hualing, Liang Yuanwei, Ma Yanhong, Jing Yuchao (only participated in the first exhibition), and Wen Ling (who joined from the second exhibition onwards).

== History ==
In 2003, the contemporary art market in China was in its early development stages, and Beijing had only a few galleries. Exhibitions during this period were primarily of two types: officially organized or underground. Both formats often proved incompatible with the aspirations and accessibility for recent art institute graduates. Wang Guangle initiated the idea of creating a collective dedicated to organizing independent exhibitions, which was supported by Song Kun, Qiu Xiaofei and Hu Xiaoyuan. Subsequent deliberations led to the expansion of the group, ultimately comprising 12 graduates from the Central Academy of Fine Arts. Notably, the majority of these members had already been classmates at the academy's affiliated high school.

N12 functioned primarily as an exhibition collective. N12's initial exhibitions were characterized by their absence of a central theme or curator. The group's twelve members engaged in their artistic practice by individually creating works and collectively participating in exhibitions.According to Ma Yanhong, the name "N12" is derived from the mathematical use of the letter "N" to represent an unknown number of items, symbolizing infinite possibilities. Wang Guangle explained, "Our works do not share a common theme; it is purely for the purpose of exhibiting together that we are called N12. The name 'N12' is an arbitrary designation without specific significance."

Between 2003 and 2006, the N12 group organized four annual exhibitions. The initial two exhibitions were independently managed and financially supported by the 12 members themselves. Tang Pei, then the director of the Central Academy of Fine Arts gallery, provided the exhibition space free of charge. N12 engaged in discussions with professional curators but ultimately decided to proceed without one, following their decision to reject proposals that involved curating artists and their works. No artworks were sold following the first exhibition. Qiu Xiaofei once said during an interview:

In fact, there was an impetus at that time, that is, no one could sell any of his paintings, so there was a strong impetus to hold an exhibition when there was no money.

However, the second exhibition saw a significant shift, with the group members gaining attention and support from galleries and art circles, leading to broader recognition and interest in N12's subsequent annual exhibitions. This increasing commercial interest, however, led to discomfort among some members, culminating in artist Hao Qiang's decision not to participate in the fourth exhibition in 2006.

== Exhibitions ==
- 2003 – Beijing – Central Academy of Fine Arts Gallery, N12 No.1
- 2004 – Beijing – Central Academy of Fine Arts Gallery, N12 No.2
- 2005 – Beijing – Central Academy of Fine Arts Gallery, N12 No.3
- 2006 – Beijing – C5 Art Center, N12 No.4
- 2014 – Beijing – Beijing Commune - Exhibition Hall, N12 No.5
- 2014 – Taipei – Linlingallery, N12 No.6
- 2023 – Beijing – Central Academy of Fine Arts Museum, "Group as Method": Research and Samples of Art Groups from Central Academy of Fine Arts
