= Zhao Yao =

Chinese artist and photographer (born 1981)

- Born: 1981 (age 44–45); Sichuan, China
- Education: Sichuan Fine Arts Institute, Chongqing
- Website: zhaoyao.org

Zhao Yao
- Chinese: 赵要
Transcriptions
Standard Mandarin
- Hanyu Pinyin: Zhào Yào
- Wade–Giles: Zhao^{1} Yao^{3}

Zhao Yao (Chinese language: 赵要, born 1981 in Sichuan, China) is an artist in installations as well as performance, video and photography. He grew up in Sichuan and currently lives and works in Beijing.

== Background ==
Zhao Yao was born in Sichuan, China in 1981 and graduated from the Design Arts Department of the Sichuan Fine Arts Institute in 2004 with a bachelor's degree. He currently lives and works in Beijing. Having received much attention in his first solo exhibition in 2010, Zhao Yao has made a significant influence on the art world with his second and third solo exhibitions I am Your Night and You Can’t See Me, You Can’t See Me. He has become an increasingly important figure in the emerging generation of the contemporary art world in China. Zhao Yao’s works involve an extremely broad range of creative media, including installation, performance, video, painting, sculptures and many others, in which he forges a haptic dissonance, dislocating mundane and spiritual, sight and touch, at once ancient, contemporary, and futuristic, and manifesting the material energies of yet-to-be-named rituals. His works display a sense of humor and confidence, tranquil yet full of tension, skillfully balancing between form and content. Through solo exhibitions, he has approached the vested exhibition system utilising a logic of interference and subversion to break down the framework of the contemporary art structure. For instance, his most recent series of works A Painting of Thought have a great sense of mission that approaches fundamental questions of art from the perspective of painting, particularly abstract painting. Unlike conceptual art in the general sense, this series is not expressing certain criticisms or concepts but instead practicing criticisms or concepts. His work has also been exhibited at Tate Modern (London, 2010), Fremantle Arts Centre (Australia, 2011), Rubell Family Collection (Miami, 2013), Eli and Edythe Broad Art Museum (Michigan, 2013), Pinchuk Art Centre (Ukraine, 2013), ZKM Center for Art and Media Karlsruhe (Germany, 2013), and Ullens Center for Contemporary Art (Beijing, 2013). Most recently, he was selected to participate in “Focus Beijing: the De Heus-Zomer Collection” at the Museum Boijmans Van Beuningen (Nederland, 2014), “Inside China” at the Palais de Tokyo (Paris, 2014), and "Adventures of the Black Square:Abstract Art and Society 1915–2015" at Whitechapel Gallery (London, 2015).

== Selected solo exhibitions ==
- 2015 "Painting of Thought", Pace Hong Kong, Hong Kong
- 2013 "Spirit above All", Pace London, London, UK
- 2012 "Zhao Yao: You Can't See Me, You Can't See Me, Beijing Commune", Beijing, China
- 2011 "Zhao Yao: I am Your Night", Beijing Commune, Beijing, China
- 2010 "51m2: 3# Zhao Yao, Taikang Space", Beijing, China

== Selected group exhibitions ==
2015

- Adventures of the Black Square, Whitechapel Gallery, London, UK

2014

- Inside China, Palais de Tokyo, Paris, France
- 2014 Asia Triennial Manchester 14: Harmonious Society, The John Rylands Library, Manchester, UK
- Vitrines Sur I'Art, Project by Palais de Tokyo, Galeries Lafayette, Paris, France
- Focus Beijing: De Heus-Zomer Collection, Museum Boijmans Van Beuningen, Rotterdam, the Netherlands
- For Armory Focus: China, The Armory Show, New York, U.S.A
- 2nd CAFAM Biennale: “The Invisible Hand: Curating as Gesture”, CAFAM, Beijing, China

2013

- 28 Chinese, Rubell Family Collection / Contemporary Arts Foundation, Miami, U.S.A
- Archipelago, V Art Center No.1 Space, Shanghai, China
- Move on Asia-Video Art in Asia 2002 to 2012, ZKM, Karlsruhe, Germany
- China China, Pinchuk Art Centre, Kyiv, Ukraine
- ON |OFF: China's Young Artists in Concept and Practice, The Ullens Center for Contemporary Art, Beijing, China

2012

- Global Groove, Eli and Edythe Broad Art Museum, Michigan, USA

2011

- The Knife's Edge, Fremantle Arts Centre, Fremantle, Australia
- 51m2: 16 Young Artists, Taikang Space, Beijing, China

2010

- Seven Young Artists, Beijing Commune, Beijing, China
- No Soul for Sale, Tate Modern, London, UK
- Move on Asia 2010, Alternative Space LOOP, Seoul, Korea; Para / Site Art Space, Hong Kong, China;
- DISCOVERIES: Re-value, Shanghai Contemporary Art Fair, Shanghai Exhibition Center, Shanghai, China
- Reflection of Minds-MOCA Shanghai Envisage III, Museum Of Contemporary Art, Shanghai, China
- Negotiations: The Second Today's Documents, Today Art Museum, Beijing, China
- Get It Louder: Sharism, Sanlitun SOHO, Beijing, China
- Media Landscape-Zone East, Korean Cultural Centre, London, UK
- Conception as Enzyme, A4 Contemporary Arts Center, Chengdu, China

2009

- Poetic-Daily: Chinese Young Artist Exhibition, the thematic project "Art Unforbidden" of Art Beijing 2009, Beijing, China
- Bourgeoisied Proletariat, Small Production, Shanghai Songjiang Creative Studio, Shanghai, China
- Re-experimentation: a Reaffirmation of Will and Enlightenment-Young Artists Promotional Exhibition, Beijing, China
- Work in Progress: How Do Artists Work, Iberia Center for Contemporary Art, Beijing, China

2008

- The 5th Small Productions Event, Shopping Gallery, Shanghai, China
- Hui Hua Fei Fa Hui, Shanghai, China
- Happy Collider, Dong Ba County, Beijing, China
- Dream & Reality, Moon River Museum of Contemporary Art, Beijing, China

2007

- The Alchemy of Shadows: the Second Lianzhou International Photo Festival (LIPF) 2007, Lianzhou, Guangdong, China

2006

- Entry Gate: Chinese Aesthetics of Heterogeneity, Museum of Contemporary Art, Shanghai, China
- Six Photos and a Small Room, Long March Space, Beijing, China

2005

- Rumor Decor, Video & Photograph Exhibition, DDM Warehouse, Shanghai, China
- Spectacle: 'Century' and 'Paradise'-the Second Chengdu Biennale, Chengdu Century City, Chengdu, China
- Archaeology of the Future, the Second Triennial of Chinese Art, Nanjing Museum, Nanjing, China

2004

- A Plan about Two Cities, Art Exhibition, Chongqing; Hong Kong, China

2003

- Suspense: Video & Photograph Exhibition, Chongqing, China

== See also ==
- Avant-garde
- Performance art
- Conceptual art
- Geometric abstraction
- Category:Chinese contemporary artists
