= Xie Molin =

Chinese artist

谢墨凛 Xie Molin
- Born: 谢墨凛 Xie Molin; 1979 (age 46–47) (Wenzhou, China)
- Education: Edinburgh College of Art, Oil Painting China Central Academy of Fine Arts, Mural Department
- Known for: Painting

Xie Molin (Chinese: 谢墨凛; born 1979) is a Chinese artist, best known for creating paintings in Beijing using a triaxial linkage machine.

== Background ==
After living in Wenzhou, a city in the Zhejiang Province of China, Xie Molin moved to Beijing in 1995 to attend the attached school of the China Central Academy of Fine Arts (CAFA). He graduated from the Mural Department of CAFA and obtained an M.F.A from the painting department of the Edinburgh College of Art.

== Career ==
Upon arriving back to Beijing Xie Molin participated in several group exhibitions including the CAFAM Future Exhibition at the CAFA Museum, ON/OFF: China's Young Artists in Concept and Practice at the Ullens Center for Contemporary Art (UCCA), Pull Left-Not Always Right at the Urban Arts Space at Ohio State University and at the Hillstrom Museum of Gustavus Adolphus College in Minnesota, 28 Chinese at the Rubell Family Collection in Miami, Focus Beijing: De Heus-Zomer Collection at the Museum Bojimans Van Beuningen in Rotterdam, Leaving Realism Behind at Pace Gallery in Beijing and A Victory Over Nothingness: Purse Snatch in Streetcar and Other Post Fevralist Absurdities at Intelligentsia Gallery in Beijing.

Xie Molin's work has been featured in solo shows at Pace Hong Kong, the Beijing Commune, and at Space Station in Beijing.
