= Hu Xiaoyuan =

Chinese artist (born 1977)

Hu Xiaoyuan (Chinese: 胡晓媛; born 1977, Heilongjiang, China) is a contemporary Chinese artist. Hu's work has been exhibited internationally and her practice includes installation, video, sculpture and painting. Hu currently lives in Beijing, China.

Hu's work often addresses themes and topics related to time, space, consciousness, and existence and draw upon specific and personal experiences. Her work has been collected by a number of institutions, including Hammer Museum, Los Angeles; M+, Hong Kong, and Power Station of Art, Shanghai. Notable exhibitions that Hu has been featured in include The Great Acceleration, Taipei Biennial (Taipei, 2014), group exhibition The Ungovernables, New Museum Triennial (New York, 2012), and Documenta 12 (Kassel, 2007).

== Early life and education ==
Hu was born in Harbin, China, in 1977. Her mother was an accountant in a state-owned company. At twelve, her mother employed a tutor to teach Hu drawing and painting. Hu studied communication design at the Central Academy of Fine Arts in China, graduating in 2002.

== Career ==
Following her graduation, Hu continued to make art. In October 2003, Hu began exhibiting with N12, a circle of twelve likely-minded artists who were all recent graduates of Central Academy of Fine Arts. N12 was established when artist Song Kun assembled a group of young artists to exhibit together. The first exhibition from the group was focused on the painting medium, a commonality of their artistic practices—the theme, painting to the n^{th} dimension, led to the group's name, N12 and first exhibition, N12 No.1 at the Central Academy of Fine Arts Gallery in 2003.

In 2007, Hu became the first female Chinese artist to participate in Documenta. She presented her work, A keepsake I cannot give away, 2005. Since 2010, Hu has been collaborating with Beijing Commune, a gallery featuring contemporary Chinese artists that represents her.

Hu began working on a trilogy of solo exhibitions in 2015, beginning with Ant Bone, at Beijing Commune. In Ant Bone, Hu explores contradiction and tension, taking inspiration from the ant—an insect of minuscule size but incredible strength, with a tough exoskeleton but delicate frame. In Grass Thorn, the second exhibition in 2017, Hu addresses existence and ephemerality. Her works in the exhibition are subject to erosion and progression over time.

In 2019, Hu was shortlisted for the inaugural Sigg Prize established by M+ in Hong Kong.

== Solo exhibitions ==
- 2017 – Grass Thorn, Beijing Commune, Beijing, China
- 2015 – Ant Bone, Beijing Commune, Beijing, China
- 2013 – A Potent Force: Duan Jianyu and Hu Xiaoyuan, Rockbund Art Museum, Shanghai, China
- 2012 – No Fruit at the Root, Beijing Commune, Beijing, China
- 2011 – Summer Solstice, Micheal Ku Gallery, Taipei, Taiwan
- 2010 – Hu Xiaoyuan, Beijing Commune, Beijing, China

== Selected group exhibitions ==
- 2015 – My Generation: Young Chinese Artists, Orange County Museum of Art, Orange County, U.S.
- 2014 – Inside, Palais de Tokyo, Paris, France
- 2014 – Focus Beijing: De Heus-Zomer Collection, Museum Boijmans Van Beuningen, Rotterdam, the Netherlands
- 2014 – My Generation: Young Chinese Artists, Tampa Museum of Art, Museum of Fine Arts, St. Petersburg, Florida, U.S.A
- 2013 – Art Statement, Art Basel, Basel, Switzerland
- 2012 – Unfinished Country-Chinese Video Exhibition, Contemporary Arts Museum Houston, Houston, U.S.A
- 2012 – The Ungovernables – 2012 New Museum Triennial, New Museum, New York, U.S.A
- 2011 – In a Perfect World, Meulensteen Gallery, New York, U.S.A
- 2010 – Beijing Voice-Annual Project, Pace Gallery/Beijing, Beijing, China
- 2010 – Negotiations-The Second Today's Documents, Today Art Museum, Beijing, China
- 2010 – Traile, Boers-Li Gallery, Beijing, China
- 2008 – Ego Documents-The Autobiographical in Contemporary Art, Kunstmuseum Bern, Bern, Switzerland
- 2008 – Sprout from White Nights, Bonniers Konsthall, Stockholm, Sweden.
- 2008 – Red Aside: Contemporary Chinese art from the Sigg Collection, Fundació Joan Miró Museum, Barcelona, Spain
- 2007 – Documenta Kassel 12, Kassel, Germany.
- 2007 – China Welcomes You..., Kunsthaus Graz Museum, Graz, Austria
- 2006 – Asia Contemporary Art Exhibition, Guang Ju, Korea
- 2005 – Mahjong-Contemporary Chinese Art from the Sigg Collection, Kunst Museum, Switzerland
- 2004 – N12 New Painting-No.2, Art Museum of the Central Academy of Fine Arts, Beijing, China
- 2003 – N12 New Painting-No.1, Art Museum of the Central Academy of Fine Arts, Beijing, China
