= Zhang Xiaogang =

Chinese painter (born 1958)

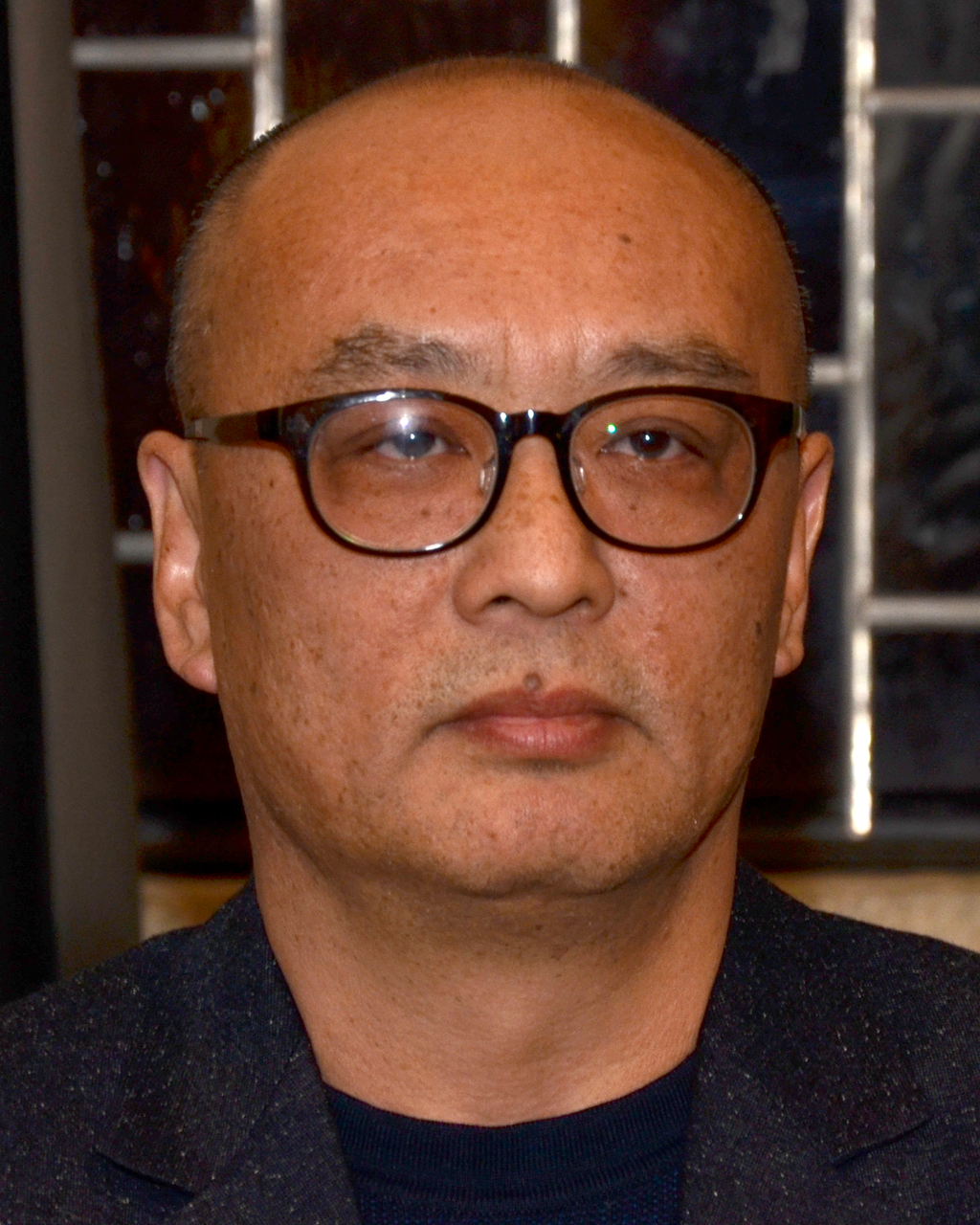
Zhang Xiaogang (2018)

Zhang Xiaogang (simplified Chinese: 张晓刚; traditional Chinese: 張曉剛; pinyin: Zhāng Xiǎogāng; born in 1958) is a contemporary Chinese symbolist and surrealist painter. Paintings in his Bloodline series are predominantly monochromatic, stylized portraits of Chinese people, usually with large, dark-pupiled eyes, posed in a stiff manner deliberately reminiscent of family portraits from the 1950s and 1960s. Recently, he also created sculptures, translating for the first time into three dimensions many characters of the sort seen in his "Bloodlines—Big Family" portrait series. These sculptures have featured in many exhibits and continue his work as one of China's leading, and most highly sought-after, contemporary artists.

== Life and career ==
Zhang was born to parents Qi Ailan and Zhang Jing (both government officials) in the city of Kunming in China's Yunnan province in 1958, and was the third of four brothers. Zhang's mother, Qi Ailan taught him how to draw as an exercise to keep him out of trouble:

"From early on, my parents worried that I would go out and get into trouble. They gave us paper and crayons so we could draw at home. . . . I gained more and more interest in art. I had a lot of time, because I didn't have to go to school. My interest increased. After I became an adult, I never gave up art. So that's how I started to draw."

His parents were taken away for 3 years by the Chinese government for re-education. [3]He came of age during the 1960s and 1970s political upheavals known as the Cultural Revolution, which exerted a certain influence on his painting.

In early 1976, Xiaogang was sent to work on a farm as part of the "Down to the Countryside Movement". Chinese water color painter, Lin Ling trained Xiaogang in 1975, teaching him formal water color and sketching techniques.

"When I was 17, I told myself I wanted to be an artist. . . I felt that art was like a drug. Once you are addicted, you can't get rid of it."

Upon the reinstitution of collegiate entrance exams, Xiaogang was accepted into the Sichuan Academy of Fine arts in 1977 where he began study oil based painting in 1978. At the time of his collegiate education, Zhang's professors continued to teach styles of Revolutionary Realism as instituted by Chairman Mao. This only served to inspire Xiaogang and his peers to opt for topics of western philosophy and introspective individualism while shunning political and ideological subject matter.

In 1982, he graduated from the Sichuan Academy of Fine Arts in the city of Chongqing in Sichuan province but was denied a teaching post he had hoped for. This led Zhang to fall into a period of depression between 1982 and 1985. During this time he worked as a construction worker and art director for a social dance troupe in Kunming. It was a time of intense self-examination for Xiaogang as he had difficulties fitting into society. Suffering from alcoholism, he was hospitalized in 1984 with alcohol induced internal bleeding causing him to paint "The Ghost Between Black and White" series which put visual form to his visions of life and death in the hospital.

"At that time, my inspiration primarily came from the private feelings I had at the hospital. When I lay on the white bed, on the white bed sheet, I saw many ghost-like patients comforting each other in the crammed hospital wards. When night dawned, groaning sounds rose above the hospital and some of the withering bodies around had gone to waste and were drifting on the brink of death: these deeply stirred my feelings. They were so close to my then life experiences and lonely miserable soul."

In 1985, Xiaogang began to emerge from the dark time in his life and joined the New Wave movement in China that saw a philosophical, artistic and intellectual explosion in Chinese culture.

Zhang formed the South West Art Group in 1986 including fellow artists, Mao Xuhui, Pan Dehei, and Ye Yongqing among more than 80 others. The group moved for 'an anti-urban regionalism' and also explored individual desire which according to Zhang had been suppressed by collectivist rationalization. They created self funded exhibitions which were a foundational step in the Chinese Avant-Garde movement.

In 1988, Zhang was appointed as an instructor at Sichuan Academy's Education Department and married later that year. He took part in the China/Avant-Garde Exhibition in 1989 at the National Art Museum of China in Beijing. However, the 1989 Tiananmen Square protests and massacre abruptly ended this period of liberal reform.

Zhang Xiaogang pursued the expressive and surreal style until the 1980s and early 90s. But after his trip to Europe in 1992, his style changes greatly.

Zhang traveled to Germany in 1992 for 3 months gaining unprecedented perspective on his own Chinese cultural identity. Upon returning he had a newfound desire to explore and revitalize his own personal past along with recent Chinese history through painting.

During his three - month stay in Germany, Zhang spent most of his time analyzing works by Western artists in museums. And he thought about his position as a Chinese artist. He said "I looked from the 'early phase' to the present for a position for myself, but even after this I still didn't know who I was. But an idea did emerge clearly: if I continue being an artist, I have to be an artist of 'China.'"

In Europe, too, Zhang begins to think about the Chinese face and reflects why he has brought images of people in books and magazines, not in actual surroundings.

Returning from Europe, Zhang Xiaogang was engaged in painting activities at Mao Xuhui's studio. He picked Tiananmen Square as the first theme and painted it using expressive strong brush touch. It also begins to survey the faces of the surrounding Chinese. At this time, the photographs of the past quadruple found at the parents' house became a dramatic turning point. Drawing on a surrealism realistic painting, he abandons the style and begins to draw a flat picture. It also represents a Chinese identity by expressing a single eyelid.

Had a major conceptual breakthrough after discovering his family photos which reminded him of the memories destroyed by the contextual cultural setting of the time.

"I felt very excited, as if a door had opened. I could see a way to paint the contradictions between the individual and the collective and it was from this that I started really to paint. There's a complex relationship between the state and the people that I could express by using the Cultural Revolution. China is like a family, a big family. Everyone has to rely on each other and to confront each other. This was the issue I wanted to give attention to and, gradually, it became less and less linked to the Cultural Revolution and more to people's states of mind."

Xiaogang was particularly inspired by a photograph of his mother as a young attractive woman, a far cry from the sickly, schizophrenic woman she had become. Led him to paint the BLOODLINES series which illustrated the entanglement of private and public life. In the mid-1990s, he exhibited all over the world including Brazil, France, Australia, UK and the US.

'Bloodline: Big Family series' of Zhang Xiaogang were exhibited The Other Face: Three Chinese Artists as part of the larger international exhibition Identità e Alterità, installed in the Italian Pavilion during the centenary 46th Venice Biennale in 1995.

Like Wang Guangyi, Xu Beihong and Wu Guanzhong, Zhang Xiaogang is a best-selling contemporary Chinese artist and a favorite of foreign collectors. His paintings feature prominently in the 2005 film Sunflower.

In 2007, a canvas of his sold for US$6 million at Sotheby's while in April 2011 his 1988 triptych oil work Forever Lasting Love, of half-naked figures in an arid landscape suffused with mystical symbols, sold for HK$79 million (US$10.1 million), a record auction price for a contemporary artwork from China, in Hong Kong.

He is represented by Pace Gallery in New York/Beijing and Beijing Commune in Beijing for his prints.

Zhang, like other Chinese contemporary artists at one time, was not able to exhibit in China because his works were too modern and suspicious. However, his paintings are now popular in China as well as in Western society, and therefore, he has more opportunities to exhibit at museums and galleries in China than he did in the past.

In recent years, he has expanded not only his oil painting works, but also his installation works of sculpture works.

== Influences ==
Western painters including Richter, Picasso and Dalí are influences. Zhang said: "I read in a book once a few words by British experimental artist Eduardo Paolozzi, which were very influential for me: 'a person can very easily have the right idea, but choose the wrong means to express it. Or he can have the right means, but lack a clear idea.'" Zhang also cites his discovery of photos of his mother as a young, attractive woman as a key inspiration for the Bloodline series.

After participating "I Don't Want to Play Cards with Cézanne" and Other Works, organized by the Pacific Asia Museum in Pasadena, California, Zhang started thinking about his way of work and decided not to paint same way with famous Western art and be an independent artist.

== Analysis ==
Referring to the Bloodline paintings, Zhang noted that old photographs "are a particular visual language" and says: "I am seeking to create an effect of 'false photographs' — to re-embellish already 'embellished' histories and lives." He said: "On the surface the faces in these portraits appear as calm as still water, but underneath there is great emotional turbulence. Within this state of conflict the propagation of obscure and ambiguous destinies is carried on from generation to generation."

Regarding the influences of China's political upheavals on his paintings, Zhang said, "For me, the Cultural Revolution is a psychological state, not a historical fact. It has a very strict connection with my childhood, and I think there are many things linking the psychology of the Chinese people today with the psychology of the Chinese people back then."

Regarding the portrait-like format of the works, he noted, "Posing for a photograph, people already display a certain formality. It is already something artificial. What I do is increase this artificiality and this sense of formalism."

Asked about the full title of the Bloodline series. Bloodline: the Big Family, Zhang said:

We all live 'in a big family'. The first lesson we have to learn is how to protect ourselves and keep our experiences locked up in an inner chamber away from the prying eyes of others, while at the same time living in harmony as a member of this big family. In this sense, the "family" is a unit for the continuity of life and an idealized mechanism for procreation. It embodies power, hope, life, envy, lies, duty and love. The 'family' becomes the standard model and the focus for the contradictions of life experiences. We interact and depend on each other for support and assurance.

The Bloodline paintings often feature small patches of colour, which are open to a variety of interpretations.

"Mother and Son"

This is the first Bloodline series Zhang Xiaogang painted as his mother in 1993. It is a picture of a different style from the later Bloodline series. No-face figures appear, but they have their own individuality, and they can pinpoint the elements that they want to talk about from place to place in the picture.

As the series progresses, the figures in Zhang Xiaogang's paintings become blurred and the clothes change to Mao suites. His distinctive face, the small eyes and the slender face, which he created, are characteristic of his paintings.

Two comrades with red baby

'Two comrades with red baby' is one of Zhang Xiaogang's "Bloodline: The Big Family" series from China and is currently on display at the National Gallery of Australia. The painting measures 150.0 cm high x 180.0 cm wide and was painted with oil on canvas. This picture, which was created with the motif of a black and white family photograph found in 1993 when he visited his parents' house, is a two-comrades behind the title and a red baby in the center. There are white traces in common on the left cheek of three expressionless people, and thin red lines connect them. The faces, hair styles, fashion, facial expressions, and the like of the characters that appear almost identical in this work convey the social atmosphere that was uniform in Mao period. The red child symbolizing the Red Guards in the era of the Cultural Revolution represents the phenomenon that even the parents were accusing at the time, but the red line connecting the three characters indicates that these three are family members. The white traces on these cheeks represent their indelible wounds. Zhang said baby like a seed of evil, not of joy in his painting.

Their unfocused eyes appear to be looking at the viewer. In other words, the viewer can feel their painful feelings in painting by facing their eyes. In other words, Zhang's painting is the medium through which we can communicate with those of the past.

Father and Daughter

Unlike his work, which started as a mother and son in the 2000s, father and daughter emerge. Also, Unlike the works of the 90s, it is mainly light gray rather than black, giving a brighter atmosphere, but it is also ambiguous. The elements that have been regarded as representatives of the Mao era are disappearing and focusing on the expression of the characters. The white patches are reddish and so are more prominent.

== Exhibitions ==
=== Solo exhibitions ===
- 1989:

Lost in the Dreams Gallery of the Sichuan Academy of Fine Arts, Chongqing, China

- 1997:

Bloodline: The Big Family-1997 Gallery of the Central Academy of Fine Arts

- 1998:

Bloodline: The Big Family-1998 Hanart Taipei Gallery, Taiwan

- 1999:

Les Camarades Gallery De France, Paris

- 2000:

Zhang Xiaogang 2000, Gallery of Max Potetch, New York

- 2003:

"Amnesia and Memory", Gallery of France, Paris, France

- 2004:

Umbilical Cord of History: Paintings by Zhang Xiaogang, Hong Kong Arts Center, Hong Kong

- 2005:

"Zhang Xiaogang 2005", Max Protetch Gallery, New York, U.S.A.

- 2006:

"Home –Zhang Xiaogang", Beijing Commune, Beijing, China "Zhang Xiaogang Exhibition", The Art Centre of Tokyo, Japan "Amnesia and Memory", Artside Gallery, Souel, Korea

- 2007:

Sara Hildén Art Museum, Tampere, Finland

- 2008:

Revision PaceWildenstein, New York "Chinese Painting: Zhang Xiaogang", Galerie Rudolfinum, Prague, Czech

- 2009:

"Record", Pace Beijing Gallery, Beijing, China "Zhang Xiaogang: Shadows in the Soul", Queensland Art Gallery, Brisbane, Australia

all

=== Selected group exhibitions ===
- 1985:

"Neo-Realism", Shanghai and Nanjing, China.

- 1987:

"Modern Art of China", National Art Museum of China, Beijing, China.

- 1988:

"Art from Southeast of China", Chengdu, China.

- 1989:

China Avant-Garde National Art Gallery, Beijing.

- 1991:

"I Don't Want to Play Cards with Cézanne" and Other Works: Selections from the Chinese "New Wave" and "Avant-Garde" Art of the Eighties Pacific Asia Museum, Pasadena, California.

- 1992:

The Guangzhou Biennial: Oil Paintings from the 90s Guangzhou, China; Documents of China Contemporary Art Show Travelling exhibition in Beijing, Guangzhou, Chongqing, Shenyang, Shanghai, Nanjing.

- 1993:

China's New Art Post-1989, Hong Kong Art Center, Hong Kong; Museum of Contemporary Art, Sydney, Australia; Marlborough Fine Art, London; Mao Goes pop Museum of Contemporary Art, Sydney; China's Experience Exhibition, Sichuan Art Gallery, Chengdu, China.

- 1994:

Chinese Contemporary Art at São Paulo 22nd International Biennial of São Paulo, Brazil.

- 1995:

46th Venice Biennial Venice, China; New Arts Vancouver Art Museum, Vancouver, Canada; Contemporary Chinese Art Exhibition, In the Absence of Ideology, Kampnagel Halle-K3, Hamburg, Germany; "Des del Pais del Centre:avantguardes artistiques xineses", Barcelona Contemporary Art Museum, Barcelona, Spain.

- 1996:

"China! New Art & Artists ", Kunstmuseum Bonn, Germany; "Reckoning with the Past: Contemporary Chinese Paintings", Fruitmarket Gallery, Edinburgh, U.K.; "The Second Asia-Pacific of Contemporary Triennial", Queensland Art Gallery, Queensland, Australia; "4 Points de Rencontre. Chine,1996", France Gallery, Pairs, French; "The 1st Academic Exhibition of Chinese Contemporary Art", National Art Museum of China, Beijing; Hong Kong Art Center, Hong Kong, China; "Reality: Present and Future", Beijing International Art Museum, Beijing, China.

- 1997:

"China New Art", Lisbon Museum of Art, Portugal; "Faces and Bodies from Middle Kingdom: Chinese Art of the 90s", Prague Art Museum, Prague, Czech Republic; "8+8-1: 15 Chinese Artists", Schoeni Art Gallery, Hong Kong; "Quotation Marks: Chinese Contemporary Paintings", Modern Art Museum, Singapore; "Red and Grey: Eight Avant-Garde Chinese Artists", Soobin Art Gallery, Singapore; "Hundred Years of Chinese Portrait", National Art Museum of China, Beijing, China.

- 1998:

"China New Art", Helsinki Art Museum, Helsinki, Finland; "Exhibition of International Contemporary Art Collection", Amsterdam, the Netherlands; "Exhibition of Collection of Shenghe Gallery", Chengdu, China; "Margaret and Contemporary Art", Dostende Contemporary Museum, Belgium.

- 1999:

"1999 Art China", LIMN Gallery, San Francisco, U.S.A; "Faces: Entre Portrait et Anonymat", Maison de la Culture Namur, Belgium; "Inside Out: New Chinese Art", Asia Society and P.S.1 Contemporary Art Center, New York; San Francisco Museum of Modern Art, San Francisco, U.S.A.

- 2000:

"Man+SPACE: Kwangju Biennale 2000", Kwangju, Korea; "Transcending Boundaries", Montclair State University, New Jersey, U.S.A.; "Portraits De China Contemporaine", Espace Culturel François Mitterrand, Périgueux, France; "The First Collection Exhibition of Chinese Contemporary Art", Shanghai Art Museum, Shanghai, China; "Hundred Years of Chinese Oil Painting", National Art Museum of China, Beijing, China; "Contemporary Art of China", Picardie Museum, Amiens, France.

- 2001:

"The 1st Chengdu Biennial", Chengdu Contemporary Art Museum, Chengdu, China; "Dream – 2001 Contemporary Chinese Art Exhibition", The Red Mansion, London, U.K.; "Towards A New Image: Twenty Years of Contemporary Chinese Art", National Art Museum of China, Beijing; Shanghai Art Museum, Shanghai; Sichuan Art Museum, Chengdu; Guangdong Art Museum, Guangzhou, China; "It's me, It's us", Gallery of France, Paris, France; "Hot Pot", Artist Center of Oslo, Norway; The 3rd Mercosul Biennial, Porto Alegre, Brazil.

- 2002:

"A Point in Time", Changsha Meilun Museum of Art, Changsha, China; "14 Chinese Artists / Made in China", Enrico Navarra Gallery, Paris, France; "BABEL 2002", National Museum of Contemporary Art, Korea; "Review 77', 78'", Gallery of Sichuan Academy of Fine Arts, Chongqing, China; "Long March", Upriver Loft, Kunming, China; "The 1st Triennial of Chinese Art", Guangdong Museum of Fine Arts, Guangzhou, China; "Image is Power", He Xiangning Art Museum, Shenzhen, China; "The Image of Concept", Shenzhen Art Museum, Shenzhen, China; "In Memory: The Art of After War", Sidney Mishkin Gallery, New York, U.S.A.; "East + West – Contemporary Art of China", Kunstlerhaus, Vienna, Austria.

- 2003:

"From China with Art", Indonesian National Gallery, Jakarta, Indonesian; "3Face 3Colors", Artside Gallery, Seoul, Korea; "Open Sky – Contemporary Art Exhibition", Shanghai Duolun Museum of Modern Art, Shanghai, China; "The East Daybreak: 100 Years of Chinese Painting", Africa Museum, Paris, France.

- 2004:

"The 5th Shanghai Biennial", Shanghai Art Muse um, Shanghai, China; "Face to Face", Accor Gallery, Taiwan; "Beyond Boundaries", Shanghai Gallery of Art, Shanghai, China; "China Now", Tang Gallery, Bangkok, Thailand; "The 1st Wuhan Fine Arts Archive Nomination", Art Gallery, Hubei Academy of Fine Arts, Wuhan, China; "Three Worlds", Shanghai Gallery of Art, Shanghai, China; "China, the body everywhere?", Museum of Contemporary Art, Marseilles, France.

- 2005:

"The 2nd Guangzhou Triennial", Guangdong Museum of Art, Guangzhou, China; "Take Off – An Exhibition of the Contemporary Art Collection in the He Xiangning Art Museum and Contemporary Art Terminal", He Xiangning Art Museum, OCT Contemporary Art Terminal, Shenzhen, China; "Always to the Front – Chinese Contemporary Art", Kuandu Museum of Fine Arts, Taipei; "Plato and His Seven Spirits", OCT Contemporary Art Center, Shenzhen, China; "Mahjong: Contemporary Chinese Art from the Sigg Collection", Kunst Museum Bern, Bern, Switzerland; Hanburger Kunsthalle, Hamburg, Germany; "Contemporary View Exhibition for Collector: China First Contemporary Art Almanac Exhibition", Millennium Museum of Art, Beijing, China; "2005 Invitational Exhibition of China Contemporary Oil Painting", Shenzhen Art Museum, Shenzhen, China; "Big River – New Period of Chinese Oil Painting and Retrospective Exhibition", National Art Museum of China, Beijing, China; "Allegory", Hangzhou, China.

- 2006:

"The Blossoming of Realism – The Oil Painting from Mainland China since 1978", Taipei Fine Arts Museum, Taipei; "Reinventing Books in Chinese Contemporary Art", China Institute, New York, U.S.A.; "Jiang Hu – Chinese Contemporary Art European and American Traveling Exhibition", Tilton Gallery, New York, U.S.A.; "Food and Desire", South Silk Restaurant, Beijing, China; "China Now: Fascination of a Changing World", SAMMLUNG ESSL Museum, Vienna, Austria.

- 2007:

"China – Facing Reality", Museum Moderner Kunst Stiftung Ludwig, Vienna, Austria; "From Southeast", Guangdong Museum of Fine Art, Guangzhou, China; "From New Figurative Image to New Painting", Tang Contemporary Art, Beijing, China; "Black White Gray – A Conscious Cultural Stance", Today Art Museum, Beijing, China; "85 New Wave: The Birth of Chinese Contemporary Art", Ullens Center for Contemporary Art, Beijing, China.

- 2008:

"Case Studies of Artists in Art History and Art Criticism", SZ Art Center, Beijing, China; "Our Future: The Guy & Myriam Ullens Foundation Collection", Ullens Center for Contemporary Art, Beijing, China; "Avant-Garde China: Twenty Years of Chinese Contemporary Art", Roppongi, Minato-ku, Tokyo, Japan; "Waiting on the Wall: Chinese New Realism and Avant-Garde in Eighties and Nineties", Groningen Museum, Groningen, The Netherlands; "Facing the Reality: Chinese Contemporary Art", National Art Museum of China, Beijing, China.

- 2009:

"19 Games-A Chinese Contemporary Art Exhibition", T Art Centre, Beijing, China; "A Gift to Marco Polo", Venice International University, Venice, Italy; "INAMANIA", Arken Museum, Copenhagen, Denmark.

- 2010:

"Beijing-Havana - New Revolution art Contemporary Art", National Art Museum of Cuba, Havana, Cuba "Reshaping History - Chinart from 2000 to 2009", China National Convention Center, Beijing, China "Clouds - Power of Asian Contemporary Art", Soka Art Center, Beijing, China "The Official Opening of Minsheng Art Museum Thirty Years of Chinese Contemporary Art", Minsheng Art Museum, Shanghai, China

all

== Prizes and awards ==
- Bronze Prize at the 22nd São Paulo Biennial Exhibition in Brazil in 1994.
- Document Prize at the First Academic Exhibition of Chinese Contemporary Art held at the China National Museum of Fine Arts and Hong Kong Art Centre in 1996.
- Prize for Contemporary New Asian Artists granted by the British Court's International Art Fund in Hong Kong.

== See also ==
- Ai Weiwei
- Wang Guangyi
- Zhang Huan
- Yang Jiechang
- Zheng Guogu
- Xu Bing
- Shen Jingdong
