= Caochangdi =

Urban village and arts district in Beijing, China

Coordinates: 39.997°N 116.499°E

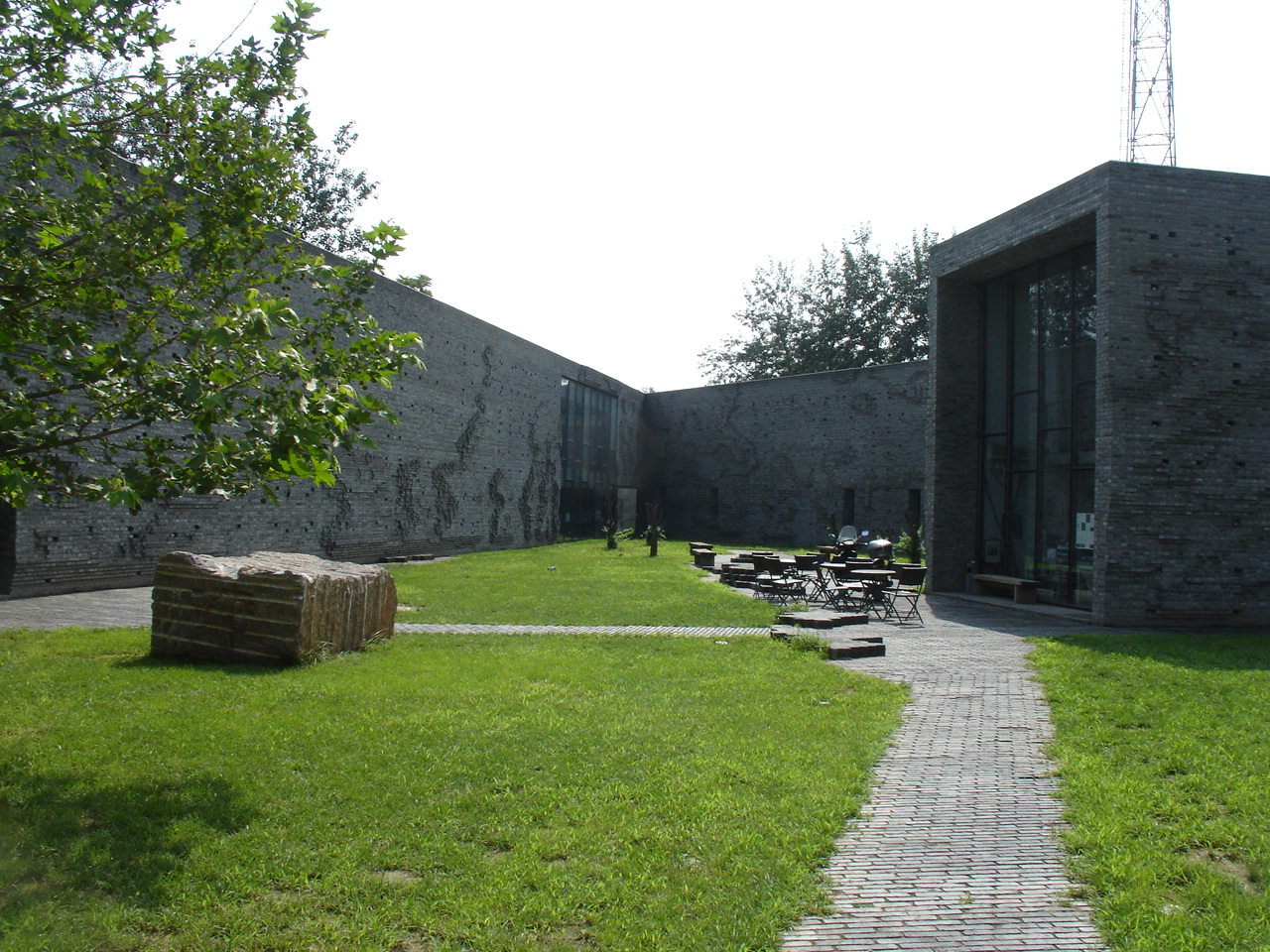
Photo of the Three Shadows Photography Art Centre in Caochangdi

Caochangdi (simplified Chinese: 草场地; traditional Chinese: 草場地; pinyin: Cǎochǎngdì) was an urban village and renowned arts district located in Cuigezhuang Township, Chaoyang District of northeast Beijing, at the intersection of the 5th Ring Road and Airport Expressway. Caochangdi Village was home to a diverse group of residents, including migrant workers, farmers, students and artists, most notably, Ai Weiwei. Caochangdi developed into a thriving arts and cultural hub when artists began to move into the area around 2000, attracting international attention similar to the 798 Art Zone. Demolition of the village began in July 2018.

== History ==
Caochangdi has changed dramatically over its history. Once unoccupied grazing land used as hunting grounds by the Imperial Court, it later became an imperial grave and garden site. During the Cultural Revolution, the region became an Agricultural People's Commune and transitioned into a farming village. When the Chinese economy opened up to the global market under Deng Xiaoping, farmers became landlords and began leasing the land to private companies, artists and galleries.

In 2009, the architects Mary-Ann Ray and Robert Mangurian published a book on the village, titled Caochangdi, Beijing Inside Out: Farmers, Floaters, Taxi Drivers, Artists, and the International Art Mob Challenge and Remake the City. It is a study of the village's history and architecture, and includes interviews with Caochangdi residents.

For many years Caochangdi was under threat of demolition. In May 2011, after petitions by its residents and businesses, Chinese authorities officially announced the village would be spared. However, in July 2018 evictions were announced in preparation for demolition and Ai Weiwei's studio was demolished shortly thereafter.

== Events ==
"Caochangdi (CCD) – The Community" was launched on September 28, 2012, as a research-driven program that hosts a series of art, design and technology events throughout Caochangdi. Consisting of gallery exhibitions, public art installations, live events, educational programs, workshops and seminars, CCD – The Community seeks to cultivate the diversity of Caochangdi through long-term curatorial projects.

== Spaces in Caochangdi ==
- Ai Weiwei 258 Fake Studio
- studio O 323 studio O
- artMIA
- Beijing Architecture Studio Enterprise (B.A.S.E.)
- C-Space
- Chambers Fine Art
- Egg Art Gallery
- Galerie Urs Meile
- Harks Gallery
- INK studio
- LI Space
- Pékin Fine Arts
- Platform China
- Taikang Space
- Three Shadows Photography Art Centre
- ShanghART Gallery
- X Gallery
- Forest Studio
- Forest Studio

== Notable people living in Caochangdi ==
- Ai Weiwei (艾未未)
- Enrico Ancilli
- Effi Meridor
- Naihan Li
- Matt Hope
- Li Songsong (李松松)
- He Yunchang
- Zhao Zhao
- Diana Coca (戴安娜 古柯)
- Sun Liangang (孙连刚)

== See also ==
- 798 Art Zone
- Pékin Fine Arts

== Book references ==
- Mary-Ann Ray and Robert Mangurian (2009), Caochangdi, Beijing Inside Out: Farmers, Floaters, Taxi Drivers, Artists, and the International Art Mob Challenge and Remake the City. Hong Kong: Timezone 8. ISBN 9881752248.
