= Wu Junyong =

Chinese artist (born 1978)

Wu Junyong (Chinese: 吴俊勇; born 1978) is a Chinese artist born in Putian, a city in Fujian province, China. He graduated from The China Academy of Art where he studied in both the Printmaking and New Media departments. He now lives and works in Hangzhou. His predominant media are paintings on paper and animated films, though in recent years he has become increasingly focused on body graffiti and impromptu tattoos.

== Biography ==
Trained as a printmaker, Wu studied new media at the China Academy of Art (CAA). Now (2011), he is an instructor at CAA.

His works, particularly the Opera series (Opera I, II and III) are a satirical comment on politics. Although Wu has lived and worked most of his life in China, he stands behind his political commentary as truthful of politicians and politics worldwide. His work comments on the way that politicians promote themselves in a surreal way. His artwork often uses signs and signals common in Chinese literature and life.

Some of his latest work includes "Who killed the deer" and "The Blind leading the Blind."

== Works ==
2018-东山西园南海北国

East Island, North Country, South Ocean, West Garden

作品说明：

这件作品包括一组动画影像和现场壁画，壁画根据不同的城市和展场展开即兴创作，同时结合作品主题。动画部分由四个影像组成，对应东西南北四个方位的主题，每个方位揉杂个人臆想和历史记忆，是关于时间和空间的私人图像异志。

------------------------------------

2016 - 梅杜萨的房间 Medusa’s Room动画装置剧场

美杜莎的房间/ 2016/ 动画装置剧场

Medusa’s Room/ 2016/ Animation Installation

作品说明：

美杜莎的房间属于涵盖动画、绘画、装置等现场作品，每次展示根据空间都有不同的展示效果。投影即是影像内容的制造者，也是现场的单一光源，不同道具和观众的影子和映射和影像互构成影子剧场，展场的布置充满即兴和随机创作。

------------------------------------

2015 - 月升 Moon Sing单频道动画录像

月升／2015／单屏动画／5分20秒

Moon Sing/ 2015/ Animation/ 5 Min 20 Sec

作品说明：

月升是一个半圆的影像，结合展场地面的映射，构成一个巨大的圆形画面，如一轮明月浮升不同空间。观众的影子和剪影风格作品互相叠加，也把现场变成一个剧场舞台。作品想要营造出一种无意中撞见的奇观，如海市蜃楼。

------------------------------------

2014 - 飞舟 Flying Ark 三频道同步动画录像

飞舟／2014／三屏同步／6分45秒

Flying Ark/ 2014/ 3 Screen/ 6 Min 45 Sec

飞舟是由三个屏幕组成的巨幅宽屏动画影像，灵感来自贝多芬第七交响乐，以多组荒诞的画面组成的寓言新编，取名飞舟是呼应诺亚方舟。

------------------------------------

2013 - 光的肖像 Portrait of Lights

光的肖像／2013／动画装置／双屏

Portrait of Light/ 2013/ Two Screen Animation Installation/ 3 Min

光的肖像由两个竖屏投影构成，是对联式的影像叙事。影片元素几乎都取自谷歌艺术计划上的古典绘画的局部内容。 主题命名“光的肖像“，和物理、心理的“光”有关，和灵感有关。

------------------------------------

2012 - 千月 Thousands of Moon 九频道动画装置

千月／2012／动画装置／9屏

Thousands of Moon/ 2012/ 9 Screen Animation Installation

作品的思路源自“千月有水千江月”的诗句。

作品想要的感觉类似一本薄薄的文集，九篇短文，每个故事都只是一个词汇的叙事容量，似在叙述和渲染，但又无物，弥漫着淡淡的莫名抒情。

悬吊于空间中的多个屏幕，犹如被拆散的页面，飘舞于风中。

------------------------------------

2011 - 时间的胃 Time of Stomach 单频道动画录像

时间的胃／2011／8分15秒

Time of Stomach/ 2011/ Animation/ 8 Min 15 Sec

这部片子是关于1949年后中国历史的隐喻,人民既是历史的创造者,也是历史的被谱写者。一切的革命和运动都在时间的胃里被消化为尘埃,时间的沙漏是一个巨大的粉碎机。本片也是艺术家对自己现实批判思维的一个总结和告别。

------------------------------------

2010 - 鸟兽散 Cloud’s Nightmare单频道动画录像

鸟兽散／2010／动画／8分30秒

Cloud’s nightmare/ 2010/ Animation/ 8 Min 30 Sec

链接: https://pan.baidu.com/s/1oIJBWq9vdPLWWnJqeZHSPA 提取码: ufiy

影片是一个八分钟长的连贯镜头组成，也像一幅历史动荡的长卷，以多个典故和寓言杂交的某段历史的私人幻想。

------------------------------------

2010 - 躁动 Dysphoria 单频道动画录像

躁动／2010／ 动画／2分02秒

Dysphoria/ 2010/ Animation/ 2Min30Sec

躁动是应联合国艾滋病项目考察之后创作的一个短片。一只重眼的乌鸦，窥视着一个分裂视角的幻想，扑克印花、扭曲变形的肉体，迷幻的听觉，如一只饥渴的乌鸦。

------------------------------------

2009 - 乱花 Flower of Chaos单频道动画录像

乱花／2009／动画／3分35秒

Flower of Chaos/ 2009/ Animation/ 3 Min 35 Sec

乱花是作者对前期批判主义作品的出走，追求图像的无意识的幻象重组，双圆如两眼视网膜的白幕，意识到图像流淌而落，如乱花开放凋谢。

------------------------------------

2008 - 蜘蛛的圆周 Circle of Spider（录像局为单屏合成版，24分50秒）

蜘蛛的圆周／2008／动画装置／8屏

Circle of Spider/ 2008/ 8 Scene Animation Installation/ 3 Min 10 Sec

《蜘蛛的圆周》是二零零八年为广州三年展创作的作品，关于后殖民的想象。作品象一组影像诗歌，如梦中行走，遭遇历史的人和事，弥漫忧伤气息。作品由八个章节组成，影像画面为双圆结构，即是望远镜视觉，也是早期的世界疆域平面图。

------------------------------------

2007 - 鲤鱼 CARPS单频道动画录像

鲤鱼／2007／动画／7分36秒

CARPS/ 2007/Animation/ 7 Min 36 Sec

《鲤鱼》的叙事结构是一场走马灯式的长卷，糅杂着俚语、政治和民俗。鲤鱼是俚语的谐音，借用民间故事里鲤鱼跳龙门的这个神奇蜕变，来对应语言和图像之间的多层变异。

------------------------------------

2007 - 春天俱乐部 Spring Club 单频道动画录像

春天俱乐部／2007／动画／5分25秒

Spring Club/ 2008/ Animation/ 5 Min 25 Sec

链接: https://pan.baidu.com/s/1_NKgKIPhfs0BdIk52CMQBA 提取码: dbgi

这件短片是对“春天”进行形而下的荷尔蒙想象，发春的人在春天的春心荡漾，以人和鸟作为主角，田园式的拉片长镜头展开，弥漫着欲望，交织着集体狂欢，这是一首伊甸园内只有雄性的短诗。

------------------------------------

2006 - 出游记 Parade 单频道动画录像

出游记／2006／动画／4分35秒

PARADE/ 2006/ Animation/ 4 Min 35 Sec

出游一种民间祭祀活动，各种菩萨神灵和乱神怪力鱼贯而出的列队游行，也是此片的创作灵感，一组组举止荒诞表演者如马戏团节目表展演于观众之前，僵硬重复乏味。

------------------------------------

2006 - 剧场 三部曲 OPERA Trilogy 三频道动画录像

剧场 三部曲／2006／动画／3分48秒，3分28秒，4分30秒

OPERA Trilogy/ 2006/ Animation/ 3Min48Sec, 3Min28Sec, 4Min30Sec

剧场三部曲的创作持续了两年，以现实批判主义视角探照戴帽子的裸人，或许代表社会化后的动物性众人，革命浪漫主义和社会集体主义弥漫，表演着枯燥形式戏剧在样板毛胚风格的舞台，不知谢幕。

------------------------------------

2005 - 等咱有钱了 Wait Us Rich单频道动画录像

等咱有钱了／2005／动画／4分51秒

Wait Us Rich/ 2005/ Animation/ 4 Min 50 Sec

《等咱有钱了》描述的是关于一个极速转型时代中个体对物质的疯狂欲望和极度狂想，也是一个个贫瘠土壤归来的个体的报复写照。作品发布于互联网，音乐来自网络彩铃歌手粥稀稀。

== Exhibitions ==
=== 2023 ===
- Otherworldly Realms of Wu Junyong, Museum of Fine Arts Boston

=== 2014 ===
- POST POP: EAST MEETS WEST, Saatchi Gallery

=== 2013 ===
- Fuck Off 2, The Groninger Museum, Netherlands
- ON | OFF: CHINA’S YOUNG ARTISTS IN CONCEPT AND PRACTICE, The Ullens Center for Contemporary Art

=== 2012 ===
- 9th Shanghai Biennale, Shanghai Museum of Contemporary Art
- The First "CAFAM Future" Exhibition, CAFA Art Museum
- 2012 15th Holland Animation Film Festival

=== 2010 ===
- MADE IN POP LAND, the National Museum of Contemporary Art, Korea
- The End Of Rainbow: WuJunyong Solo Exhibition, ifa gallery, Shanghai (solo)
- Wu Junyong: Totalitarian Portrait, F2 Gallery, Hong Kong (solo)
- D-2 Wu Junyong Solo Exhibition, D-lounge, Beijing (solo)

=== 2008 ===
- Farewell to Post-Colonialism, The Third Guangzhouo Triennial, Guangdong Museum of Art
- Club Primavera, Hanart TZ Gallery, Hong Kong (solo)

=== 2007 ===
- Opera, Chinese Contemporary, New York (solo)
- Red Hot! Asian Art from the Chaney Family Collection, Houston Museum of Fine Arts, Houston

=== 2006 ===
- Gong Chan No.1, Shanghai Duolun Museum of Modern Art, Shanghai
- The Sky has a Mouth, Chinese Contemporary Gallery, Beijing (solo)
- Wu Junyong, Chinese Contemporary Beijing, Factory 798, Dashanzi, Beijing (solo)
- He Xiangning Art Museum, Shenzhen
- Yellow Box, Qingpu (Shanghai)

=== 2005 ===
- Ten Eras Ten Colours, Soka Contemporary Space, Beijing
- In the Deep of Reality: A Case of Chinese Contemporary Art, Hangzhou
- Archaeology of the Future, Nanjing Triennial, Nanjing
- Let the Ideas Be Seen, Hangzhou
- Fantasy: Interactive Video, Hangzhou
- Gifts: A Case of Chinese Contemporary Art, Hangzhou
- Archaeology of the Future, the second Triennial of Chinese Art, Nanjing

=== 2004 ===
- Automat, Contemporary Art Exhibition, Suzhou
- The Second Chinese New Media Art Festival, Hangzhou
- Circle Place, Hangzhou
- Format, Contemporary Art Exhibition, Hangzhou

=== 2003 ===
- Bai Taling, Contemporary Art Exhibition, Hangzhou
- Relate to the World, Contemporary Art Exhibition, Hangzhou
- Shadow/woman, Contemporary Art Exhibition, Hangzhou
- The minority is subordinate to the majority, Shanghai
- Relate to Word, Contemporary Art Exhibition, Hangzhou

=== 2002 ===
- Shadow, Shanghai

== External links and further reading ==
- Official Site
- Instagram
- The Emperor's New Clothes: Interview with Wu Junyong by Christen Cornell at Artspace China, 28 September 2011
- Wu Junyong on Fabien Fryns Fine Art
