= Li Songsong =

Chinese artist

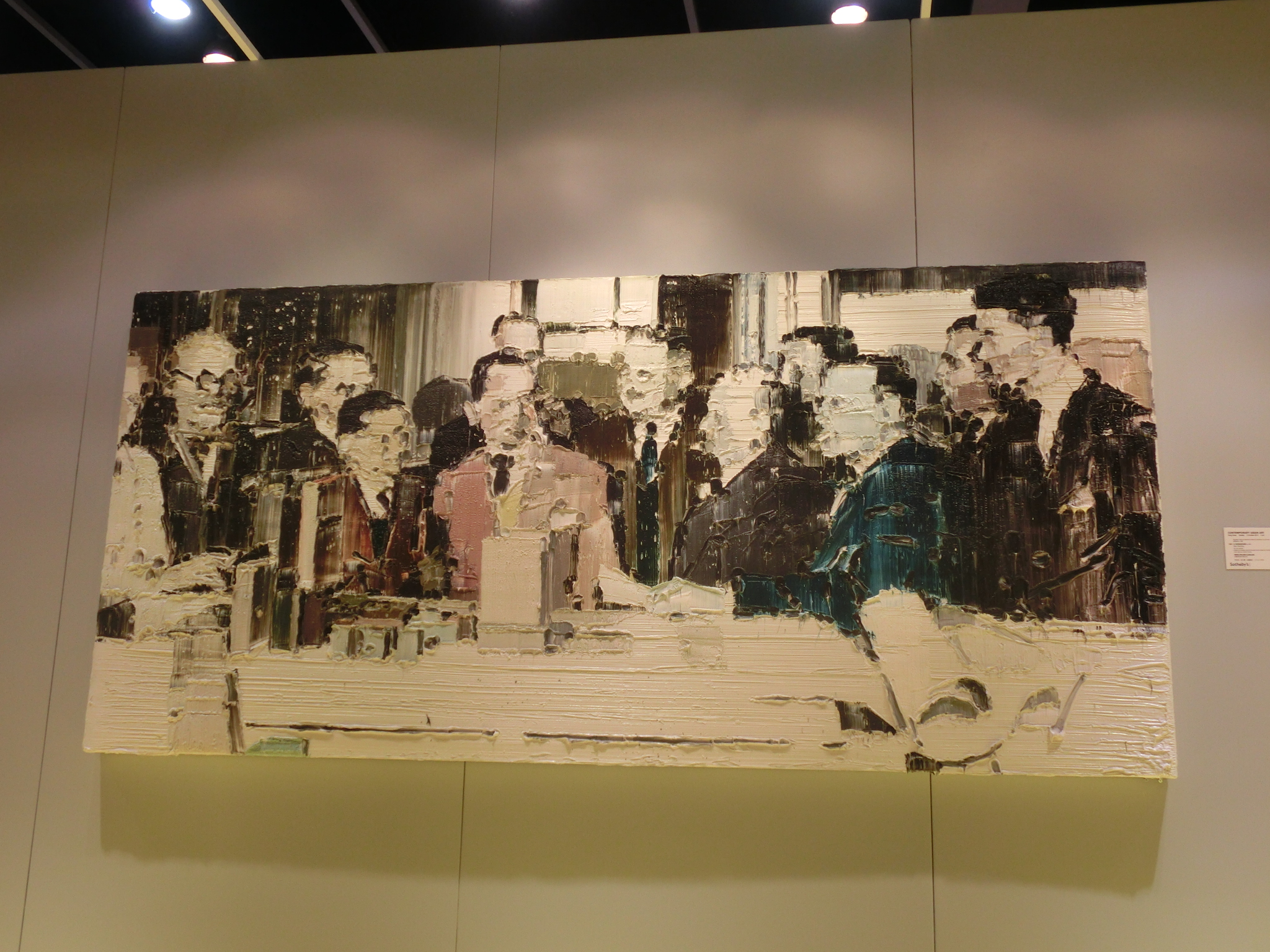
- Born: Li Songsong; 1973 (age 51–52); Beijing, China
- Occupation: artist

Chinese name
- Chinese: 李松松
Transcriptions
Standard Mandarin
- Hanyu Pinyin: Lǐ Sōngsōng

Li Songsong (李松松; born 1973 in Beijing) is a Chinese artist working in Beijing.

His paintings recreate public resource images of modern Chinese history, such as the National People's Congress. Li works on large scale canvases with oil paint.

== Biography ==
Li Songsong is renowned for his thickly layered paintings that animate the fragmentary nature of images and memory, paying particular attention to the people, events, and themes of modern and contemporary Chinese history. Li received his Bachelor of Fine Arts degree in oil painting from Central Academy of Fine Arts (CAFA). He was one of the first Chinese artists to establish a studio in the 798 Arts District of Beijing in 2002. He uses images primarily from newspapers, magazines, the internet, book, and film stills. Despite this heavy use of political images, Li does not consider himself a political artist. His deconstruction of the images removes bias and invites interpretation. He has been called a member of China's "in-between" generation: he was too young to have experienced life under Mao Zedong but old enough to remember the Tiananmen Square uprising, which occurred while he was attending China's CAFA-affiliated high school. This status sets him apart both from his older peers who lived through the Cultural Revolution and from younger colleagues who have known only relative openness and growing international awareness of China's experimental art scene. In an article in Art in America, the author Richard Vine says, "He does not choose images to make a point; he reacts to images that trigger his strongest and most intuitive artistic responses"

== Artistic style ==
Li's work is characterized by the contrast between his removed portrayal of events and expressive emotional technique. His painting style is unique in that he warps and reconstructs his images with layers of paint often section by section in an array of colors, giving the final work an abstract and ambiguous message that is left up to the interpretation of the viewer. The sections are completed methodically from top left to bottom right, giving the finished pieces a collage-like appearance. The details of the original photograph are erased while the figures are emphasized, allowing the painting to appear as either emerging or disappearing. Li uses strictly brushes to create his artwork, though many of his paintings display a variety of textures and techniques almost bursting off the surface. His medium is oil paint applied to canvas and aluminum panels. He often listens to music while working in his studio, claiming that it is indispensable to him. Li is aware of the jarring and psychological effect his paintings can have, explaining that "there's a little cognitive dissonance going on." When describing his view of his artwork, Li says, "It's like telling a story packed with violence and gore with a huge smile on your face. It's how the stories are told that attracts you, and that's the art of it. Everyone knows the story. The important thing is that way that you tell it." Li says that every stage of his artwork is important. He starts with a simple idea and his goal is to bring different people and ideas together.

"Li Songsong is concerned with the intrinsic humanity that underpins all the images he appropriates and the memories they have the potential to bring to mind in his audience."

== Influences ==
Chinese conceptual photography became a major trend in contemporary Chinese art around the mid-90s. The interrelationship between photography and painting is a fundamental issue in contemporary Chinese art. This is because art during the post-Cultural Revolution era was dramatically affected by this interrelationship in many different ways, making it nearly impossible for photographers and oil painters to ignore. Other artists who were affected by this interrelationship and integrated it into their work included Chen Danqing, Hong Lei, Liu Zheng, Shi Chong, and Han Lei.

Li was also heavily influenced by a book series known as the "old photo craze" (lao zhaopian re) published during contemporary China. The books were published by Shandong Pictorial Press, founded in 1994, and the first three issues became instant blockbusters in the mass book market. A total of three hundred thousand copies were printed of each of the three issues, and two hundred and forty thousand copies were printed for the fourth and final issue. These four issues were published within a single year from December 1996 to October 1997 and sold more than 1.2 million copies altogether. This made the series one of the most popular publications in post-Cultural Revolution China. This caused many artists, including Li, to become interested in representing history and memory during the post-Cultural Revolution era.

The use of photographs in artwork began in the early 80s with stressed and damaged photos from the Communist Revolution era. Then, during the mid to late 90s, artists used images to represent the Sino-Japanese War. After this, experimental artists began using family photos to create "private histories". This led to the use of contemporary art forms such as installation, video, and multi-media art. Since the 90's, there has been an effort to demonstrate photography's role in forging "memory links" between past and present. Some artists and photographers have gone from this to focusing more on the impermanence of the history and memory of the events displayed in the photographs.

These historic photos are familiar to millions of Chinese people. By incorporating photographs into artwork, artists are able to trigger the viewer's memory of the event being portrayed while simultaneously demonstrating their artistic talent and providing a new perspective.

A documentary image can become "a visual symbol, with a meaning extending far beyond the photograph's specific content."

== Recent work ==
Li designed the poster for this year's (2012) Spoleto Festival USA. The festival involves musical and theatrical offerings. The poster, titled Beast, was inspired by a photograph but was altered with Li's style of multiple layers of paint and sections. The work invites interpretation and was a unique choice for the show because the posters chosen in the past have traditionally been bold and brightly colored. The two abstract figures in the poster can be interpreted to be connected with the subject of the festival, as one of the opera productions "Feng Yi Ting" by Chinese composer Guo Wenging. The opera involves seduction and murder that ultimately saves an empire.

== Exhibitions ==
=== 2011 ===
Li's most recent exhibition was a solo exhibition at Pace Gallery in New York. It was Li's first U.S. solo show and included 11 large scale impasto oil paintings.

=== 2010 ===
Great Performances This exhibition provided a new perspective of contemporary Chinese art. Through various forms of art, including video, photography, installation, painting, etc., artists represented the uncertainty in the minds of the Chinese people over the rapid advancement and development of Chinese society. "Role playing", or the use of body language in art, became popular as the idea of self-identity began to develop further in China. Self-identity began to emerge in the 1990s. This is where the idea of performance art comes into play. Curator Leng Lin says, "in such a compressed age, our 'performances' have been irrefutably passionate. 'Real' and 'surreal', it is a great performance."

This exhibition included his famous Pig Years painting (2010). This painting is 12 feet high completed with a variety of colors. It spans four separate panels, each with overlapping smaller panels, which are attached together by aluminum plates. The painting appears abstract up close, but comes together to reveal a pile of pigs when viewed from a distance.

=== 2009 ===
Abstract This was a solo exhibition at Pace Beijing. It included 16 paintings executed with Li's characteristic patchwork style and depicting dangerous situations involving planes. These include Peach Garden (2008), named after the Taipei Taoyuan (literally "Peach Garden"), showing a group of people crowded around an empty plane of a pilot who defected to Taiwan around the 1980s. A related piece, Betrayer (2008), depicts a pilot raising his hands in victory after landing. Finally, two other works, Oxygen Mask (2009) and Life Raft (2009), are both based on images taken from an airline safety brochure. These works collectively express the hidden dangers that come with the freedom of flight. Six Men (2008), depicting Japanese Kamikaze pilots, and Public Enemy (2008), loosely based on a newspaper photo of Yang Jia who allegedly killed several police officers after being accused and tortured over stealing a bicycle, were two other pieces included in the exhibit.

Red Storm, Rijksmuseum Twenthe Museum voor oudeen moderne kunst, Enschede, Holland

=== 2008 ===
Christian Dior & Chinese Artists, Ullens Center for Contemporary Art, Beijing, China

The Revolution Continues, Saatchi Gallery, London, UK

Encounters, Pace Beijing, Beijing, China

New World Order – Contemporary Installation Art and Photography from China, Groningen Museum, Groningen, Holland

2D/3D Negotiating Visual Languages, PKM Gallery, Beijing, China

Half-Life of a Dream, Contemporary Chinese Art from the Logan Collection, San Francisco Museum of Modern Art, San Francisco, USA

Mahjong: Contemporary Chinese Art from the Sigg Collection, The University of California, Berkeley Art Museum, Pacific Film Archive, Berkeley, USA

=== 2007 ===
Altered, Stitched & Gathered, P.S.1 Contemporary Art Center, New York

Mahjong - Chinesische Gegenwartskunst aus der Sammlung Sigg, Museum der Moderne, Salzburg, Austria

Through the Painting, 2nd Moscow Biennale, Moscow, Russia

Time Different - New Works from the Frank Cohen Collection, Initial Access, Wolverhampton, Great Britain

Art from China - Collection Uli Sigg, Centro Cultural Banco do Brazil, Rio de Janeiro, Brazil

=== 2006 ===
Hypnogenesis, Galerie Urs Meile, Lucerne, Switzerland

Hypnogenesis, Galerie Urs Meile, Beijing, China

CHINA NOW - Faszination einer Weltveränderung, Sammlung Essl, Klosterneuburg / Vienna, Austria

Mahjong - Chinesische Gegenwartskunst aus der Sammlung Sigg, Hamburger Kunsthalle, Germany

=== 2005 ===
PICTORIAL DNA made in China, Galerie Urs Meile, Lucerne, Switzerland

Mahjong - Chinesische Gegenwartskunst aus der Sammlung Sigg, Kunstmuseum Bern Switzerland

CHINA: as seen BY CONTEMPORARY CHINESE ARTISTS, Spazio Oberdan, Milano, Italy

=== 2004 ===
Received an honorable mention at the 4th China Contemporary Art Awards

China's Photographic Painting, China Art Season Gallery, Beijing

China und was mich sonst bewegt, Galerie 99, Aschaffenburg

Solo exhibition, Belgische Botschaft Beijing

=== 2003 ===
Left Hand, Right Hand, Deutsch-Chinesische Gemeinschaftsausstellung zeitgenössischer Kunst, 798 Space, Beijing 3.

fade in, Fotografie Ausstellung, 798 Art Space, Beijing

=== 2002 ===
China Contempo, Art Seasons Gallery, Singapore

Face to Face, Chinese and Indian Contemporary Art, Shen Gallery, Singapore

== See also ==
- Pékin Fine Arts
