= Qiu Xiaofei =

Chinese artist (born 1977)

Qiu Xiaofei (Chinese: 仇晓飞; born 1977, Heilongjiang, China) is a contemporary Chinese artist.

Qiu studied at the Central Academy of Fine Arts (中央美术学院) in Beijing and received a Bachelor of Fine Arts in oil painting in 1998 and Graduate from China Central Academy of Fine Arts in 2002. He now lives and works in Beijing, China.

In 2007 Qiu's work was included in the Tate Gallery exhibition The Real Thing: Contemporary Art from China. In 2009 the Doosan Gallery, Seoul, Korea held a solo exhibition of work entitled Invisible Journeys. In 2011 his work was included in MengLong－Oscurita, Collateral Events of the 54th International Art Exhibition, Venice Biennale 2011, Venice, Italy. His work is in the collection of the Metropolitan Museum of Art.
