= Sheng Qi =

Chinese performance artist and painter (born 1965)

Sheng Qi (Chinese: 盛奇; pinyin: Shèng Qí; born 1965 in Hefei, Anhui Province, China) is a Chinese performance artist and painter. He was one of the original founders of the Chinese performance art group, Concept 21. Sheng Qi graduated from Beijing Academy of Art and Design in 1988. In 1989, in protest to the massacre at Tiananmen Square, he chopped off the little finger on his left hand and buried it in a porcelain flowerpot, which remained in Beijing during his subsequent exile in Europe.

Sheng Qi graduated with an MFA at Central Saint Martins in 1998. In 1999 he returned to Beijing, but returned to London again in 2010, which is where he currently resides.

== Exhibitions ==
- 2011 Square, Fabien Fryns Fine Art, Los Angeles
- 2009 New Paintings, F2 Gallery, Beijing
- 2006 Confidential, F2 Gallery, Beijing
