= Today Art Museum =

Coordinates: 39.9000°N 116.4677°E

- Established: 2002
- Location: Beijing, China
- Type: Art museum
- Director: Alex Gao
- Website: www.todayartmuseum.com

The Today Art Museum is a museum located in Beijing.
