= 棋王 =

棋王 meaning "chess, king", etc.

It may refer to:

- Chess King, 1978 novel by Taiwanese writer Shi-Kuo Chang
- The Chess Master (Chinese: 棋王, 'King of Chess'), a 1984 novel by Ah Cheng
  - Chess King (film), a 1988 film based on the novel
  - King of Chess (1991 film), a 1991 film based in part on the novel

== See also ==
- Chess King (disambiguation)
