= The Stars Art Group =

20th-century Chinese avant-garde group of non-professional artists

The Stars Art Group or simply "The Stars" (Xīngxīng 星星) was a Chinese avant-garde group of non-professional artists in the late 1970s and early 1980s (the exact interval usually given as 1979 to 1983). It was founded by Ma Desheng and Huang Rui; its members included Wang Keping (王克平), Qu Leilei, Ah Cheng, Ai Weiwei, Li Shuang, and Yan Li. A historically significant exhibition, now called the Star Art Exhibition, took place in late 1979 in Beihai Park, Beijing, outside the China Art Gallery. After the exhibition was closed by officials, the group staged a protest for cultural openness. They succeeded in reopening the exhibition. The exhibition took place between 23 November and 2 December, in which around 200,000 people attended the event. The group organized another exhibition the next year. Around and after 1983, the group disbanded, partly due to their members going into exile under political pressure, especially the Anti-Spiritual Pollution Campaign of 1983.

The Stars Art Group was a foundational movement of the contemporary Chinese avant-garde active in the late 1970s and early 1980s. Mostly self-trained, the Stars championed individualism and freedom of expression both in their work and public activities. Taking personal experience and social issues as their subject matter, they pointedly diverged from state-sanctioned Socialist Realism. Other members and affiliates included Zhang Hongtu, Zhang Wei, Yang Yiping, Mao Lizi, Bo Yun, and Shao Fei.

== Arrest of Li Shuang ==
Because of her radical movement in art and politics, and her relationship with a French diplomat, Emmanuel Bellefroid, Li Shuang was arrested by the government and received a two-year sentence. This led to a political tension between China and France at the time. Later an agreement was made between two countries and Li was released. This incident abolished the banned interracial marriage in China.

== See also ==
- Culture of the People's Republic of China
- Chinese intellectualism
- The Fifth Modernization
- Chinese democracy movement
- Beijing Spring
- 1989 Tiananmen Square protests
