= Qu Leilei =

Chinese artist (born 1951)

Qu Leilei (曲磊磊, born 1951) is a contemporary Chinese artist currently based in the UK.

Qu grew up in China during the Cultural Revolution and spent some time forced in to hard labour as his parents were branded capitalists. Later, he served as an art director at China Central Television.

In 1979, as one of the founding members of the avant-garde "Stars Group", together with, Wang Keping, Ma De Sheng, Mao Lizi, Huang Rui, Li Shuang, Ah Cheng and Ai Weiwei, Qu took part in the first exhibitions of contemporary art in China.

After Qu left China, he relocated to London to practice his art, lecture and exhibit internationally. His paintings were exhibited at a solo display in the Ashmolean Museum at Oxford in 2005, the first time in the Ashmolean that a show was devoted singly to the work of a living artist. He has also had a solo exhibition at Beijings National Gallery. His works have been exhibited by the British Museum and the V&A in London. His work at the British museum is now part of their permanent collection and this was marked with a symposium about himself and the Stars movement and his work.

Also in 2005, he was one of three finalists for the Arts Council England "Pearl Award for Creative Excellence".
