= Chess King (disambiguation) =

Chess King was an American men's clothing retailer 1968–1995.

Chess King or King of Chess may also refer to:

- King (chess), the most important piece in the game of chess
- Chess King, 1978 novel by Taiwanese writer Shi-Kuo Chang
- The Chess Master (Chinese: 棋王, 'King of Chess'), a 1984 novel by Ah Cheng
  - Chess King (film), a 1988 film based on the novel
  - King of Chess (1991 film), a 1991 film based in part on the novel
