= Chess Master (disambiguation) =

A chess master is someone who has been awarded a chess title such as Grandmaster or International Master.

Chess Master could also refer to:

- Chessmaster, an application by Ubisoft
- The Chess Master, a novel by Ah Cheng
- Chess Masters: The Endgame a BBC competition series
