= 798 Art Zone =

Arts district in Dashanzi, Chaoyang district, Beijing, PRC

Coordinates: 39°59′21″N 116°29′17″E

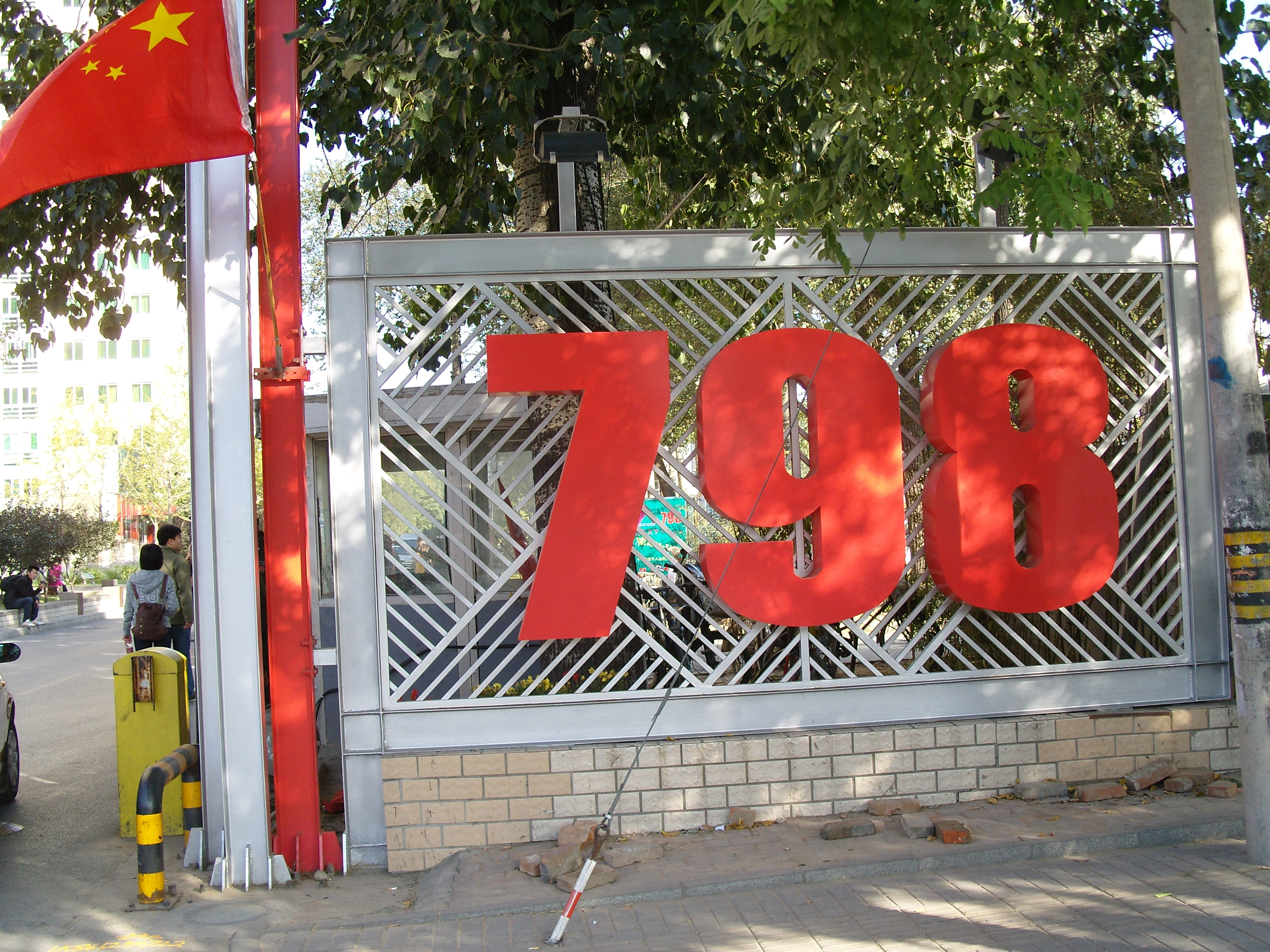
The entrance of the #798 Art District

798 Art Zone (Chinese: 798艺术区; pinyin: 798 Yìshùqū), or Dashanzi Art District, is a complex of 50-year-old decommissioned military factory buildings boasting a unique architectural style that houses a thriving artistic community in Dashanzi, Chaoyang District, Beijing. The area is often called the 798 Art District or Factory 798 although technically, Factory #798 is only one of several structures inside the complex formerly known as 718 Joint Factory. The buildings are within alleys number 2 and 4 on Jiǔxiānqiáo Lù (酒仙桥路), south of the Dàshānziqiáo flyover (大山子桥). The area is anchored by the UCCA Center for Contemporary Art, the largest and most visited venue in the area. In recent years, it has been the main venue for the annual Beijing Queer Film Festival and Beijing Design Week.

== Construction ==
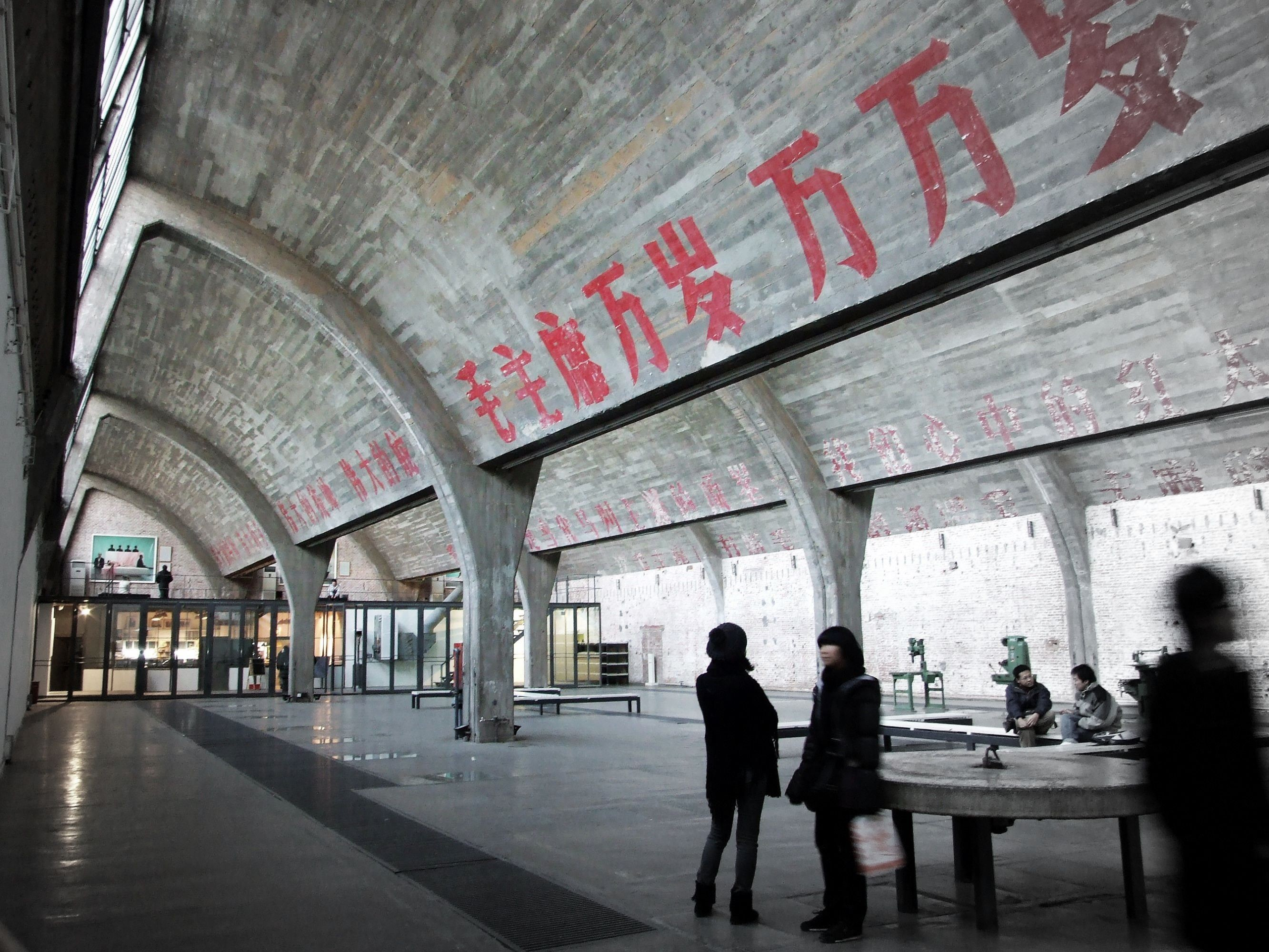
798 Space gallery, January 2009. Old Maoist slogans are visible on the ceiling arches.

The Dashanzi factory complex began as an extension of the "Socialist Unification Plan" of military-industrial cooperation between the Soviet Union and the newly formed People's Republic of China. By 1951, 156 "joint factory" projects had been realized under that agreement, part of the Chinese government's first Five-Year Plan. However, the People's Liberation Army still had a dire need of modern electronic components, which were produced in only two of the joint factories. The Russians were unwilling to undertake an additional project at the time and suggested that the Chinese turn to East Germany where much of the Soviet Union's electronics equipment was imported. So at the request of then-Premier Zhou Enlai, scientists and engineers joined the first Chinese trade delegation to East Germany in 1951, visiting a dozen factories. The project was green-lighted in early 1952 and a Chinese preparatory group was sent to East Berlin to prepare design plans. This project, which was to be the largest by East Germany in China, was then informally known as Project #157.

The architectural plans were left to the Germans, who chose a functional Bauhaus-influenced design over the more ornamental Soviet style, triggering the first of many disputes between the German and Russian consultants on the project. The plans, where form follows function, called for large indoor spaces designed to let the maximum amount of natural light into the workplace. Arch-supported sections of the ceiling would curve upwards then fall diagonally along the high slanted banks or windows; this pattern would be repeated several times in the larger rooms, giving the roof its characteristic sawtooth-like appearance. Despite Beijing's northern location, the windows were all to face north because the light from that direction would cast fewer shadows.

The chosen location was a 640,000 square meter area in Dashanzi, then a low-lying patch of farmland northeast of Beijing. The complex was to occupy 500,000 square meters, 370,000 of which were allocated to living quarters. It was officially named Joint Factory 718, following the Chinese government's method of naming military factories starting with the number 7. Fully funded by the Chinese side, the initial budget was enormous for the times: 9 million Rbls or approximately 140 million RMB (US$17 million) at today's rates; actual costs were 147 million RMB.

Ground was broken in April 1954. Construction was marked by disagreements between the Chinese, Soviet and German experts, which led at one point to a six-month postponement of the project. The Germans' harshest critic was the Russian technology consultant in charge of Beijing's two Soviet-built electronics factories (714 and 738), who was also head consultant of the Radio Industrial Office of the Second Ministry of Machine Building Industry. The disputes generally revolved around the Germans' high but expensive quality standards for buildings and machines, which were called "over-engineering" by the Russians. Among such points of contention was the Germans' insistence, historical seismic data in hand, that the buildings be built to withstand earthquakes of magnitude 8 on the Richter scale, whereas the Chinese and Russians wanted to settle for 7. Communications expert Wang Zheng, head of Communications Industry in the Chinese Ministry of National Defense and supporter of the East German bid from the start, ruled in favor of the Germans for this particular factory.

At the height of the construction effort, more than 100 East German foreign experts worked on the project. The resources of 22 of their factories supplied the construction; at the same time, supply delays were caused by the Soviet Red Army's tremendous drain on East Germany's industrial production. The equipment was transported directly through the Soviet Union via the Trans-Siberian Railway, and a 15 km track of railroad between Beijing railway station and Dongjiao Station was built especially to service the factory. Caltech-educated scientist Luo Peilin (罗沛霖), formerly head of the preparatory group in 1951-1953, was Head Engineer of Joint Factory 718 during its construction phase. Luo, now retired in Beijing, is remembered by his former colleagues as a dedicated perfectionist whose commitment to the obstacle-strewn project was a major factor of its eventual success.

== Operation ==
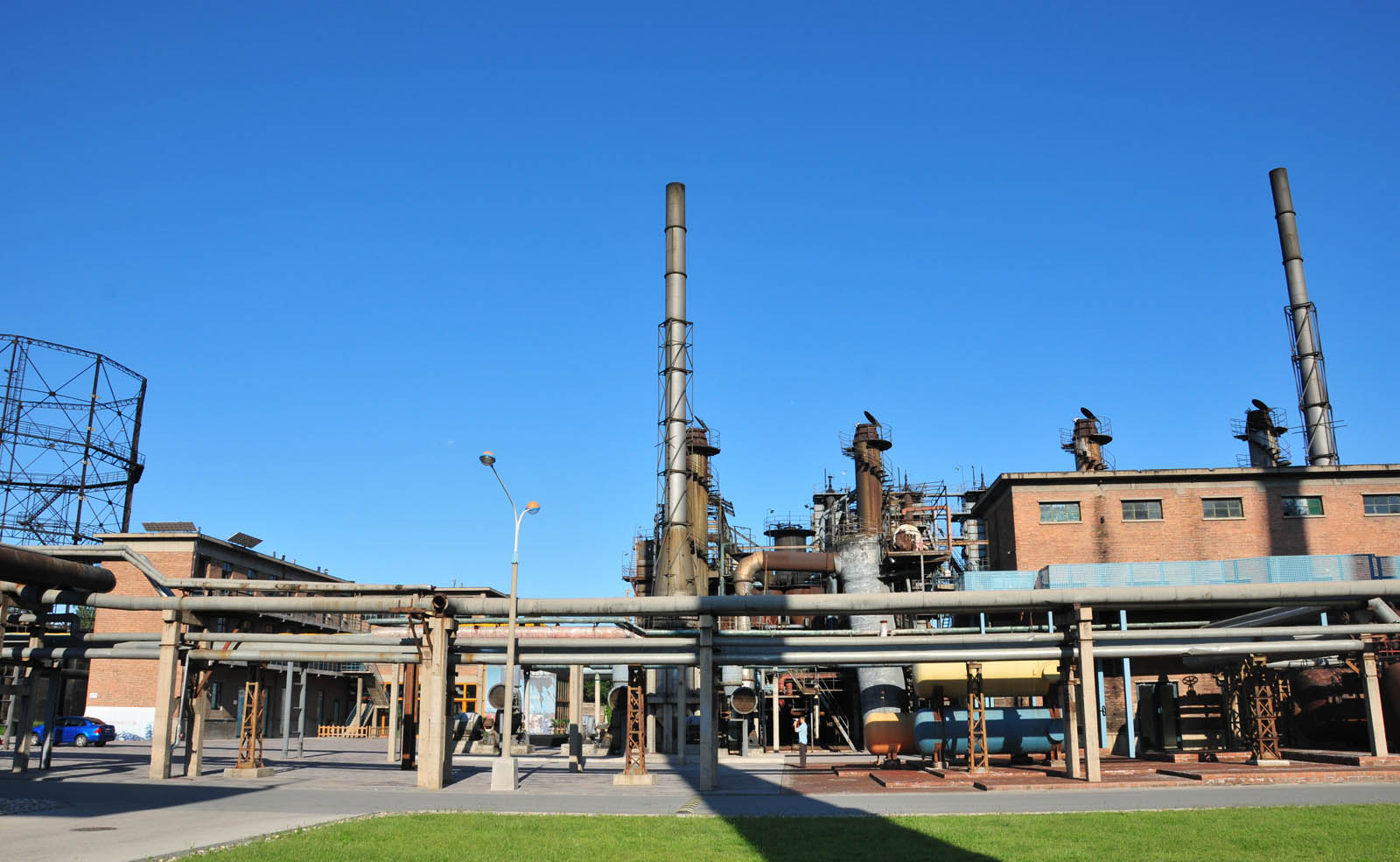
Joint Factory 718

Joint Factory 718 began production in 1957, amid a grandiose opening ceremony and display of Communist brotherhood between China and East Germany, attended by high officials of both countries. The first director was Li Rui (李瑞), who had been involved in the early negotiations in Berlin.

The factory quickly established a reputation for itself as one of the best in China. Through its several danwei or "work units", it offered considerable social benefits to its 10,000-20,000 workers, especially considering the relative poverty of the country during such periods as the Great Leap Forward. The factory boasted, among others:

- the best housing available to workers in Beijing, providing fully furnished rooms to whole families for less than 1/30 of the workers' income;
- diverse extracurricular activities such as social and sporting events, dancing, swimming, and training classes;
- its own athletics, soccer, basketball and volleyball teams for men and women, ranked among the best in inter-factory competitions;
- a brigade of German-made motorcycles, performing races and stunt demonstrations;
- an orchestra that played not only revolutionary hymns but also German-influenced classical Western music;
- literary clubs and publications, and a library furnished with Chinese and foreign (German) books;
- Jiuxianqiao hospital, featuring German equipment and offering the most advanced dental facilities in China.

The factory even had its own volunteer military reserves or jinweishi (近卫师), which numbered hundreds and were equipped with large-scale weapons and anti-aircraft guns.

Workers' skills were honed by frequent personnel exchanges, internships and training in cooperation with East Germany. Different incentives kept motivation high, such as rewards systems and "model worker" distinctions. At the same time, political activities such as Maoism study workshops kept the workers in line with Chinese Communist Party doctrine. During the Cultural revolution, propaganda slogans for Mao Zedong Thought were painted on the ceiling arches in bright red characters (where they remain today at the latter tenants' request).

Frequent VIP visits contributed to the festive atmosphere. Notable guests included Deng Xiaoping, Jiang Zemin, Liu Shaoqi, Zhu De, and Kim Il-Sung.

The Joint Factory produced a wide variety of military and civilian equipment. Civilian production included acoustic equipment for Beijing's Workers' Stadium and Great Hall of the People, as well as all the loudspeakers on Tiananmen Square and Chang'an Avenue. Military components were also exported to China's Communist allies, and helped establish North Korea's Wireless electronics industry.

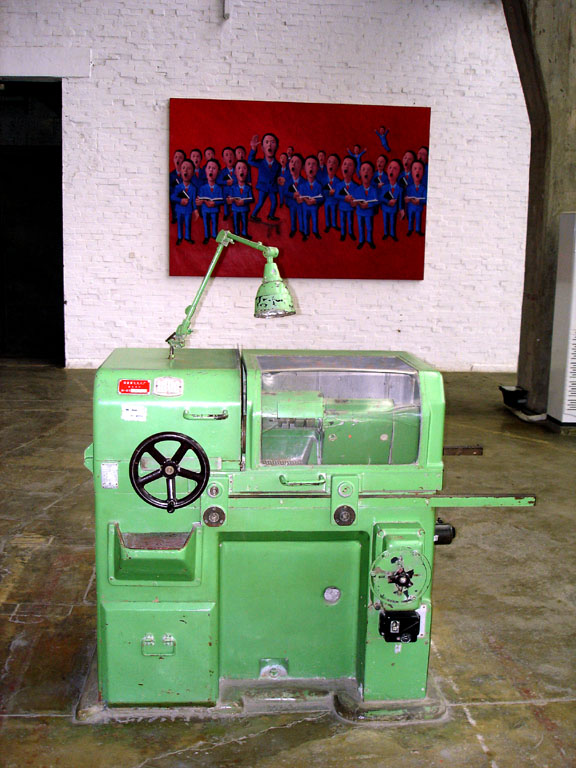
One of the old machine tools in front of some contemporary art in Dec 2005

After 10 years of operation, Joint Factory 718 was split into more manageable components, such as sub-Factories 706, 707, 751, 761, 797 and 798. The first Head of sub-Factory 798 (the largest) was Branch Party Secretary Fu Ke (傅克), who played a major role in recruiting skilled workers from southern China and returned overseas Chinese.

However, the factory came under pressure during Deng Xiaoping's reform and opening up of the 1980s. Deprived of governmental support like many state-owned enterprises, it underwent a gradual decline and was eventually rendered obsolete. By the late 1980s and early 1990s, most sub-factories had ceased production, 60% of the workers had been laid off, and the remains of the management were reconstituted as part of a real-estate operation called "Seven-Star Huadian Science and Technology Group", charged with overseeing the industrial park and finding tenants for the abandoned buildings.

== Artistic rebirth ==
The Dashanzi factory complex was vacated at around the time when most of Beijing's contemporary artist community was looking for a new home. Avant-garde art was frowned upon by the government and the community had traditionally existed on the fringes of the city. From 1984 to 1995, they worked in run-down houses near the Old Summer Palace in northwestern Beijing, until their eviction. Many then moved to the eastern Tong County (now Tongzhou District), more than an hour's drive from the city center.

Then in 1995, Beijing's Central Academy of Fine Arts (CAFA), looking for storage and workshop space, set up in the now defunct Factory 706. The temporary move became permanent and in 2000 Sui Jianguo, Dean of the Department of Sculpture, located his own studio in the area. The cluttered sculpture workshops have always remained open for visitors to peek at the dozens of workers milling about.

By 2003, an artistic community of over 30 artists, designers, and publishers had developed. The first creatives to take residence in the district included artist Xu Yong, designer artist Huang Rui, publisher Robert Bernell, painter Li Songsong, and Beijing Tokyo Art Projects' Tabata Yukihito.

One of the first exhibition spaces, Beijing Tokyo Art Projects (BTAP, 北京东京艺术工程), was opened by Tabata Yukihito of Japan's Tokyo Gallery. Inside a 400-m^{2} division of Factory 798's main area, this was the first renovated space featuring the high arched ceilings that would become synonymous with the Art District. BTAP's 2002 opening exhibition "Beijing Afloat" (curator: Feng Boyi), drew a crowd of over 1,000 people and marked the beginning of the popular infatuation with the area.

In 2002, Huang Rui (黄锐) and hutong photographer Xu Yong (徐勇) set up the 798 Space gallery (时态空间) next to BTAP. With its cavernous 1200-m^{2} floor and multiple-arched ceilings at the center of Factory 798, it was and still is the symbolic center of the whole district. (Huang and Xu since designed at least seven spaces in the area and became the prime movers and de facto spokespersons of the District.) A glass-fronted café was set up in the former office section at the back of the 798 space, opening into a back alley now lined with studios and restaurants such as Huang's own At Café, and Cang Xin's #6 Sichuan restaurant, the area's "canteen".

American Robert Bernell was the first foreigner to move in and brought his Timezone 8 Art Books bookshop, gallery and publishing office to a former factory canteen. One of Timezone 8's early employees was fashion designer Xiao Li, who along with her husband, performance artist Cang Xin, and Bernell, helped artists secure and rent spaces in the area.

Through word-of-mouth, artists and designers started trickling in, attracted to the vast cathedral-like spaces. Despite the lack of any conscious aesthetic in the Bauhaus-inspired style, which grounded architectural beauty in practical, industrial function, the swooping arcs and soaring chimneys had an uplifting effect on modern eyes, a sort of post-industrial chic. At the artists' requests, workers renovating the spaces preserved the prominent Maoist slogans on the arches, adding a touch of ironic "Mao kitsch" to the place.

In 2003, Lu Jie (卢杰) set up the Long March Foundation, an ongoing project for artistic re-interpretation of the historical Long March, inside the 25,000 Li Cultural Transmission Center (二万五千里文化传播中心). Around that time, Singapore-owned China Art Seasons (北京季节画廊) opened for display for pan-Asian art, and was one of several new galleries setting up at that time.

The UCCA Center for Contemporary Art was set up shortly thereafter in one of the largest factories in the complex, and after recent renovations, serves as the anchor institution and most prominent, and most visited, art landmarks in the area.

== Notable exhibitions ==
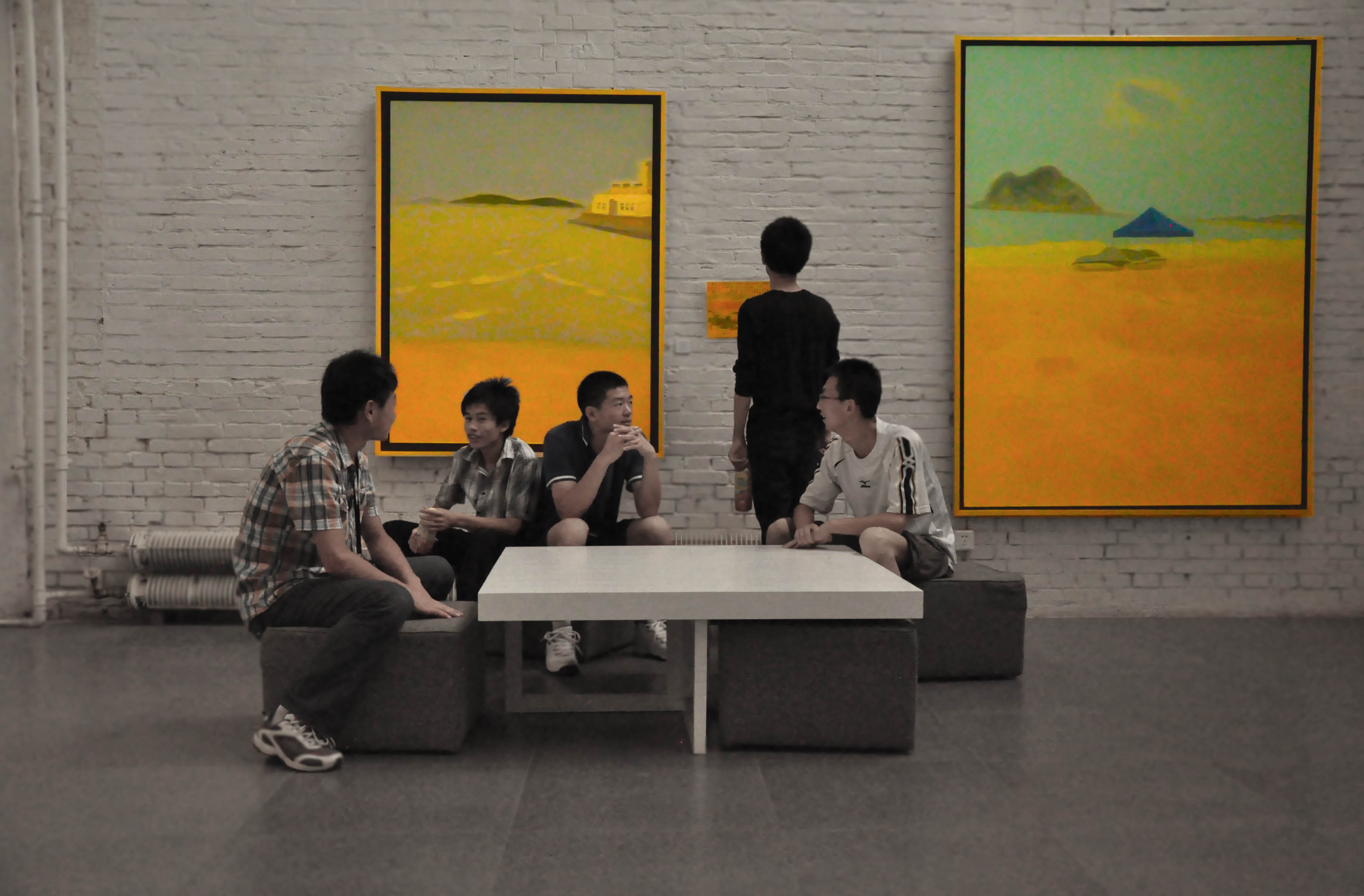
An art gallery at 798

Several exhibitions of note took place in 2003. In March 2004, "Transborder Language", part of the First Dashanzhi International Art Festival, (curators: Huang Rui and Thomas J. Berghuis) combined poetry installation and performance art. "Blue Sky Exposure" was held outdoors in southern Beijing and then relocated to the Art District. On April 13, despite widespread fear of public gatherings during SARS, the exhibitions "Reconstruction 798" (798 space) and "Operation Ink Freedom" (25,000 Li Cultural Transmission Center) drew crowds of 5,000 and definitely confirmed the area's widespread appeal.

In July, with Beijing in full construction boom, Wang Wei's "Temporary Space" (curator: Philip Tinari) featured workers completely enclosing an area of the exhibition with a brick wall and then removing the bricks one by one. In September, "Left Hand - Right Hand" (curator: Feng Boyi) showcased Chinese and German sculptors at 798 Space and Daoyaolu Workshop A. Among the works was Sui Jianguo's enormous concrete sculpture "Mao's Right Hand", which is just what the name suggests, and an example of modern Chinese art's ironic reflections on history.

The first Beijing Biennale was held on September 18, 2003 at the Art District and featured 14 exhibitions. "Tui-Transfiguration" (curator: Wu Hung; tui here roughly means moult) featured photographs by East Village chronicler Rong Rong (荣荣) and his wife, Japan-born Inri (映里). Their works notably featured their own naked bodies in various strange locales, and were generally well-received despite being criticized by some as typical of the self-centered nature of much art in the area.

The first Dashanzi International Art Festival, directed by the ever-present Huang Rui, was held from April 24 to May 23, 2004. This first edition, named Radiance and Resonance/Signals of Time (光•音 / 光阴), was beset by logistical problems arising from landowner Seven-Star Group's increasing irritation with the art community. As such, the festival became as much a public protest against the area's upcoming destruction that a showcase of art itself.

The environmental performance artist Brother Nut installed his project, "Nongfu Spring Market," in 798 Art Zone in 2018. A commentary on pollution in China, this project received international attention including an article in The New York Times. One of the most (in)famous displays at the Festival was performance artist He Yunchang having himself cemented shut in a wooden box with only two pipes for ventilation, and staying there for 24 hours before being chiseled out, prompting the proverbial "Is it art?" questionings. "Shock" exhibitions have become increasingly common in the Art District.

In 2008 there were notable exhibitions of foreign artists from Italy ("Rabarama. Italian Shape", AnniArt Gallery 798,): Rabarama and Cesare Berlingeri.

== Gentrification ==
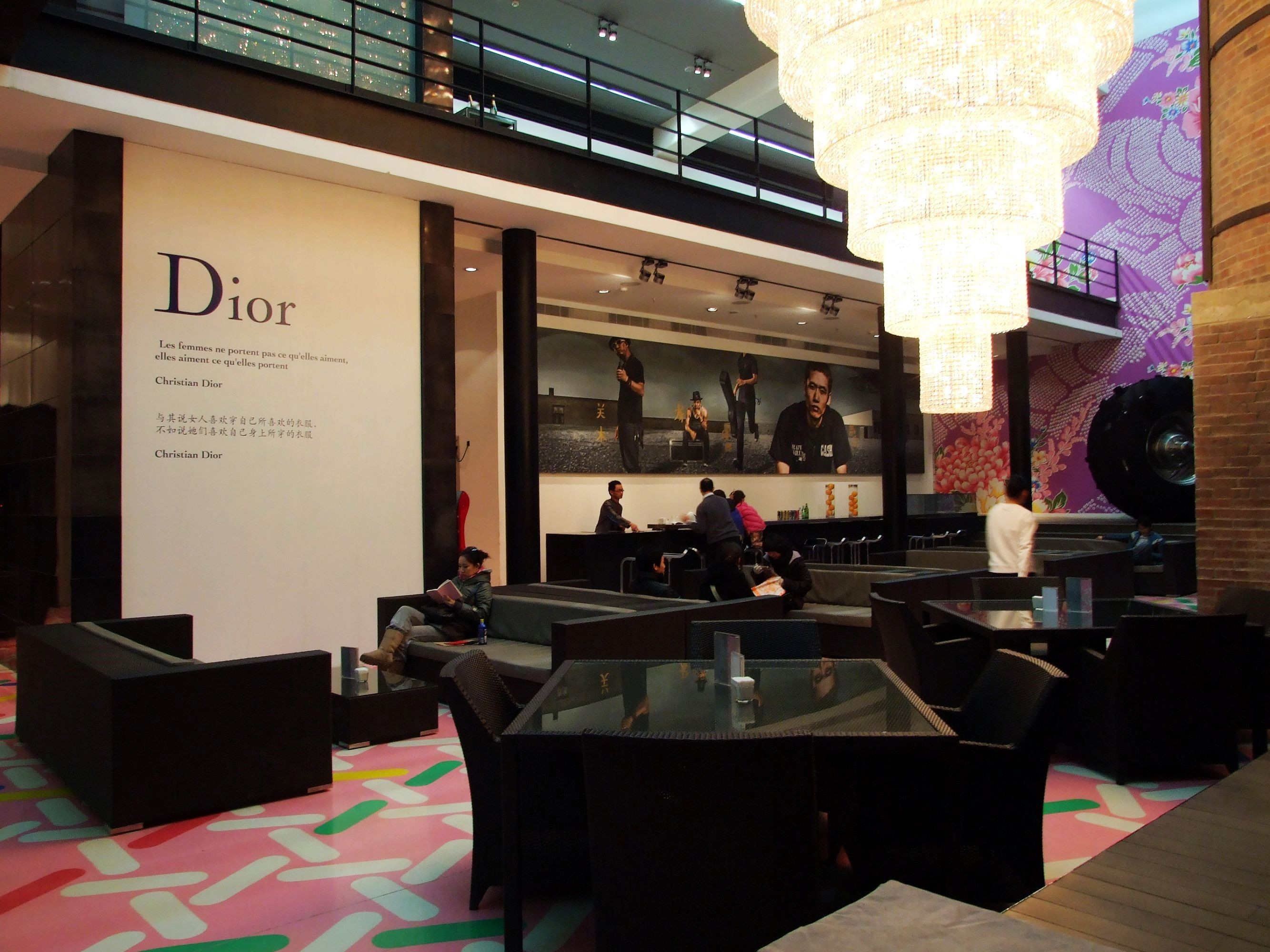
Dior in 798 Art District

The district's popularity has exploded since the opening of BTAP and 798 Space in 2002, with scores of galleries, lofts, publishing firms, design companies, high-end tailor shops, and cafés and fancy restaurants setting up. In 2003, around 30 artists and organizations had set up studios or offices in the area, with 200 more reportedly on the waiting list to move in.

Fashionable clubs also sprang up such as Zhou Ying's "Vibes", known for its fetish nights. A former factory cafeteria became Yan Club (仁俱乐部), owned by well-known Beijing socialite and writer Li Xuebing or "Bing Bing" (冰冰), also owner of Sanlitun's Jam House. Notable performers at Yan included Morcheeba in March 2003.

In keeping with the area's "community spirit", most galleries and spaces in Dashanzi do not charge either exhibitors or visitors. Instead, they generally sustain themselves by hosting profitable fashion shows and corporate events; among others, Sony had a product launch gala at 798 space, and watchmaker Omega presented a fashion show at Yan Club. Others include Christian Dior, Royal Dutch Shell and Toyota; supermodel Cindy Crawford also made an appearance. Even Li Ka-shing's Cheung Kong Holdings held an event in the district, which some found unsettling given the real-estate industry's designs on the land it sits on.

As such, Dashanzi is now a center of Beijing's nascent "BoBo" (bourgeois-bohemian) community. Huang Rui and Xu Yong are good representatives of the type. A local guru of sorts is artist/curator/architect Ai Weiwei (艾未未), whose self-designed house in Caochangdi just outside the factory complex was a trend-setter.

In the absence of any rent control, tenants' costs have escalated. In 2000–2001, rents were 0.8 RMB per square metre per day (24 RMB or US$2.90/m^{2}/month, or about US$0.27/sq.foot/month). They increased slightly to 30 RMB/m^{2}/month in 2003, and then doubled to 60 RMB/m^{2}/month (US$0.67/sq.foot/month) in 2004. Total costs can be quite high considering the average 200–400 m^{2} area of the spaces, and the overhead of renovating and retrofitting the rooms to use modern appliances.

Another sign of creeping gentrification is the increasing number of luxury cars parked near the galleries; local artist Zhao Bandi purchased the first Alfa Romeo convertible in Beijing. Some (but not all) of the resident artists and their patrons are quite rich compared to other occupants of the area, the remaining factory workers. Some of the workshops are still operational on a small scale, mostly doing car repair or industrial laundry.

Some local artists such as Zhang Zhaohui, a New York-trained art critic and curator, and architect Zhu Jun, a new Dashanzi resident, have criticized the Art District as being less about art and more about show. Says Zhang: "Few of the artists come to seriously practice art. Most of them just come for opportunities to exhibit and sell works or just have parties and gatherings." (China Daily) On the other hand, young artists like Zhang Yue find this atmosphere particularly conducive to establishing one's career. In the course of one summer, Dashanzi Art District's Platform China Contemporary Art Institute and Unlimited Art Gallery afforded this rising artist two well-received solo shows.

== Closure averted ==
In the days of Joint Factory 718, Dashanzi was chosen for its peripheral position well outside the city center. The artists who later moved there were attracted from the fringes of the city as well. However, the area today sits right on the strategic corridor between the Capital Airport and downtown Beijing along the Airport Expressway. In the context of China's current real estate bubble, the district is highly likely to be demolished in the near future. Hints of development are already appearing with the western entrances of the complex flanked by the Jiuxian and Hongyuan luxury apartment towers. There are all the current government projects which call for the expansion of the neighboring industrial park to turn all of Dashanzi into a high-tech development zone similar to Zhongguancun. Landowner Seven-Star Group thus hopes to re-employ some of the 10,000 laid-off workers it is still responsible for.

Influential members of the artist community and architects are lobbying various government instances to persuade them to allow the old buildings to remain, to help grow organically a cultural center that Beijing otherwise lacks. In 2003, International Architects Salon roped in architects from various international architectural associations and renowned architects like Bernard Tschumi and Coop Himmelblau's Wolf Prix to help emphasize how important attractive spaces like Factory 798 are to the international design community. They point out that such communities are important if Beijing, and China, is to become a major source of creative design instead of mere low cost low value-added manufacturing. (This issue has far-reaching implications in the domain of intellectual property protection in China - some experts believe that the local IP laws will start to be enforced only when China becomes a source of its own intellectual property.)

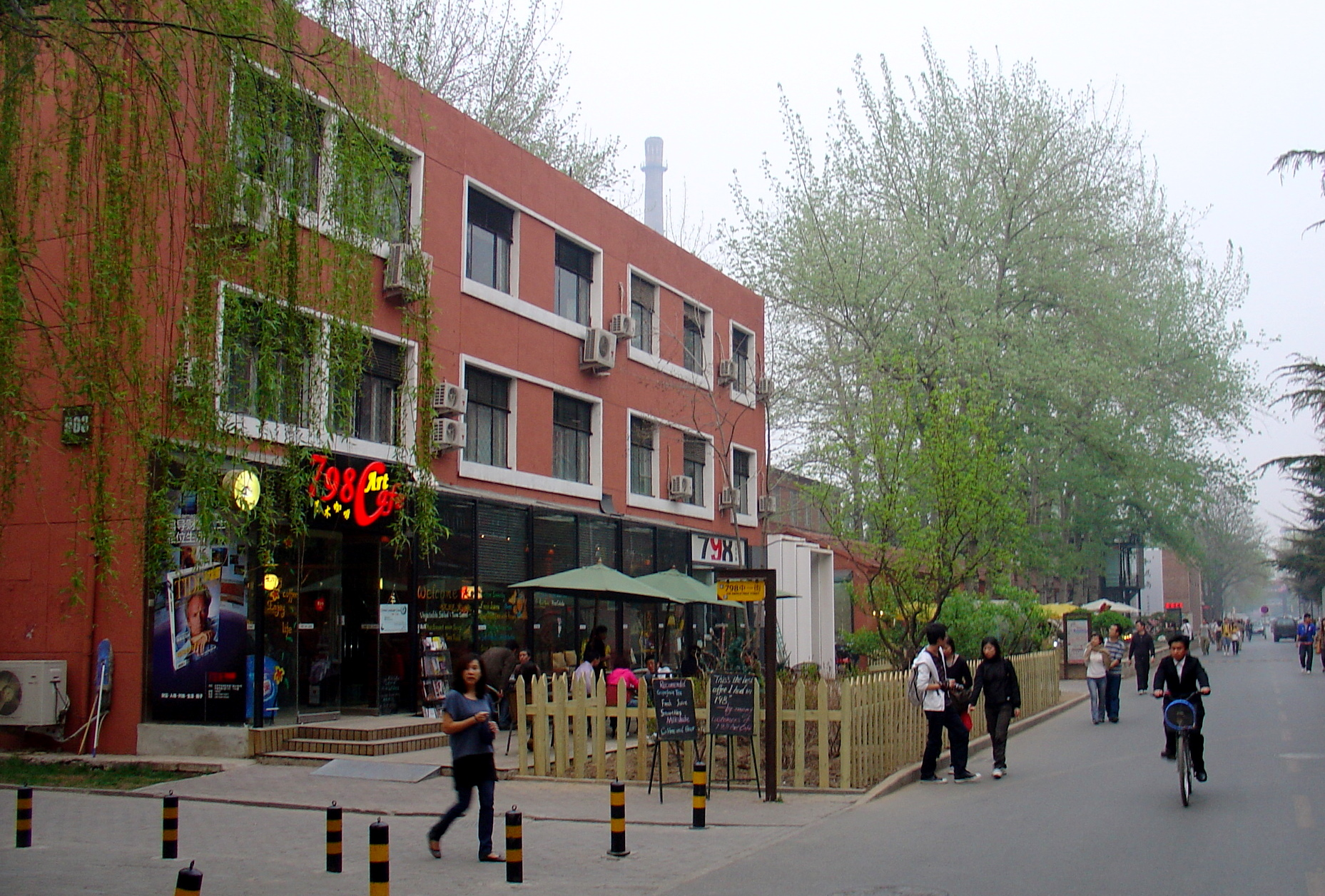
Patrons stroll through the 798 Art Zone, Beijing, April 2009

A crucial participant in the lobbying effort is resident sculptor Li Xiangqun, professor at the Academy of Arts and Design of Tsinghua University, who was elected deputy of the 12th National People's Congress in 2004. Li presented the municipal government with a formal bill in February, requesting the suspension of the destruction plans and preservation of the buildings as part of an Olympic-caliber cultural center.

Professors from architecture schools such as Beijing's Central Academy of Fine Arts and the Southern California Institute of Architecture have proposed various development plans for the area that involve preserving the buildings, although those do not appear especially profitable financially.

Meanwhile, attempts have been made to appeal to the developers' sense of economics by pointing out similarities with New York's Greenwich Village and SoHo, where the high profitability of real estate is due partly to the presence of former post-industrial artists' dwellings. Those arguments have so far been ignored.

In 2004, Seven-Star Group froze the rental of new spaces and prohibited all renewals. Tenants resorted to subdividing and subleasing their spaces, to which the Group responded by attempting to forbid subleasing to cultural organizations or to foreigners, hoping to drive out the artists. Tenants, despite some of them having leases still valid for several years, were given the ultimatum of December 31, 2005 to vacate the premises.

By 2006, public outcry was relentless, and prominent cultural organizations from around the world spoke up. An unlikely duo including SevenStar, a government-led consortium acting as stewards of a pension fund for former factory workers, and Guy Ullens, a Belgian philanthropist who had amassed the world's largest collection of contemporary Chinese art, commissioned Boston-based design firm Sasaki Associates to produce a vision plan which sought to re-purpose the district into a stable source of revenue while providing a much-needed destination for China's burgeoning arts scene. The plan needed to inspire multiple stakeholders with often divergent interests. First, the city government in Beijing wanted to ensure that the district would a visible and acclaimed destination. Second, the land-holder, SevenStar Group, needed to generate a sustainable revenue stream to endow the pension fund of former factory workers. Third, international and Chinese non-profit cultural institutions investing in 798 such as the UCCA Center for Contemporary Art wanted to focus on culture and protecting the district's distinctive character. Finally, residents of adjacent neighborhoods were vocal about the need for community parks, recreation, and job opportunities.

Considering these voices equally, the Sasaki Associates master plan for 798 endeavored to reach consensus with a long-game approach to redevelopment. Leading with clear principles and detailed guidelines, the plan was an opportunity to codify the values of the district. To address the city's concerns, connections from nearby transit stations were strengthened, historic buildings were cataloged, and guidelines for their preservation and adaptive reuse were outlined. Next, a long-term strategy for obtaining revenue from new building leases was realized. A proposed arts school, artist-in-residence program, and requirements that tenants are involved in a creative industry provided cultural institutions with a sense that 798 would attract new talent and ideas. Last, multiple parks and plazas responded to community desire for more public open space.

By the end of 2007, it was decided that the area would continue in its current format of a special art zone. In 2009, the area has been refurbished and is thriving. 798's abandoned factory buildings have been transformed into new museums, galleries, and cafes. Fallow fields and once hidden courtyards have reemerged as settings for outdoor sculpture, fashion shows, and other cultural events. The roads have been repaved, new galleries have opened, and a cafe culture is emerging. What began as a small collection of ephemeral studios and other workspaces has become the third most visited destination in Beijing, after the Forbidden City and the Great Wall.

== See also ==
- 50 Moganshan Road

== Book references ==
- Huang Rui (黄锐), editor (2004). Beijing 798: Reflections on Art, Architecture and Society in China (798工厂：创造北京的新艺术街、建筑、社会). Hong Kong: Timezone 8 / Thinking Hands (现代书店艺术书屋 / 思想手设计). ISBN 988-97262-3-8.
- Zhu Yan, with contributions by Yin Jinan and Li Jiangshu (2004). 798: A Photographic Journal.. Hong Kong: Timezone 8. ISBN 988-97262-7-0.
- Ye Ying (叶滢), Transmutation 798《窑变798》, New Star Press, Beijing, 2010. ISBN 978-7-80225-946-1
