= Zhang Hongtu =

Chinese artist based in New York City (born 1943)

- Born: 1943 (age 82–83); Pingliang, Gansu Province, China
- Education: Central Academy of Arts and Crafts, Beijing
- Known for: Painting, Sculpture, Collage
- Notable work: Long Live Chairman Mao Series (1989), Last Banquet (1989)
- Movement: Political Pop
- Spouse: Huang Miaoling
- Website: http://www.momao.com/

Zhang Hongtu (Simplified Chinese: 张宏图; Traditional Chinese: 張宏圖; Wade-Giles: Chang Hung-t'u; Pinyin: Zhāng Hóngtú) (born 1943) is a Chinese artist based in New York City.

Zhang was born in Pingliang. He works in a variety of media such as painting (sometimes with soy sauce), sculpture, collage, ceramics, digital imaging and installation. His work explores the freedom to criticize the Chinese authorities afforded to an artist living in the West. It also reflects on themes of authority and belief (specifically the power of iconic imagery) and cross-cultural 'East and West' connections. These themes are largely derived from his "outsider" standing as a Muslim in China and, after his move to the United States, as a Chinese citizen in the Western world.

He studied at the Central Academy of Arts and Crafts in Beijing.

In 1987 he took part in the founding of The Chinese United Overseas Artists Association, along with Li Shuang, Qu Leilei, and Ai Weiwei.

== Biographical ==
=== Early life ===
Zhang Hongtu was born in 1943 into a Muslim family in Pingliang, 100 miles northwest of Xi'an. His family was constantly on the move however, so that Hongtu never quite belonged to any of the places he moved. Zhang Hongtu's father, Zhang Bingduo, was a devout Muslim and traveled throughout China to start schools in the Arabic language. From 1947 to 1950, with the Chinese civil war raging, Hongtu's father mobilized his family, moving them from Pingliang in the northwest to Shanghai, Suzhou, and Nanjing, and then north to Zhengzhou. Before the communist defeat, Zhang Bingduo intended to escape with his family to Hong Kong, but was convinced to move to Beijing by a Muslim professor.

In Beijing, the members of the Zhang family were outsiders. Hongtu's father worked various jobs for the new government, including the Minority Affairs Association, the Xinhua News Agency, the Central Broadcasting Administration, and eventually he became the vice president of the National Muslim Association. However, their religious affiliation in an officially atheistic state made life increasingly difficult. Bingduo was branded a Rightist in 1957. And while he avoided being sent to a reeducation camp, Hongtu's mother lost her job and talk of religion disappeared within the household.

=== The Great Leap Forward and the Cultural Revolution ===
In 1958, Chairman Mao Zedong's Great Leap Forward began and its effects were felt profoundly by the Zhang family. From that period, Hongtu remembered being asked to create a mural at his junior high school. He produced a mural with three revolutionary flags – one symbolizing the Great Leap Forward, a second symbolizing the People's Communes, and the third symbolizing the General Principle of Socialist Construction. But when the Great Leap Forward failed as the result of economic mismanagement, famine plagued China. Zhang Hongtu remembered: "we discovered all the hungry people, beggars from the country so skinny, with no clothes. Every single day, and you're so hungry yourself that you just couldn't sleep but so tires you can't wake up. We heard one thing from school and the newspapers but we saw something else from reality and we felt betrayed. You needed a scale to weigh out food to make sure there'd be some at the end of the month. I'd go with my father to the park to pick plants to eat."

In 1966, Chairman Mao tried to redeem the failure of the Great Leap Forward by introducing a Cultural Revolution. At its outset, the Muslim Association was disbanded, greatly disillusioning Zhang Hongtu's father, who refused to re-accept his job when the Cultural Revolution finally ended in 1976.

=== Art education within the context of the Cultural Revolution ===
In 1960, when Hongtu was sixteen years old, he began his studies at the high school attached to Beijing's prestigious Central Academy of Arts. However, in 1964, the school was declared "corrupt" by Chairman Mao's wife, Jiang Qing, and Hongtu began his professional art studies at Beijing's Central Academy of Arts and Crafts. At the dawn of the Cultural Revolution in 1966, Hongtu's art studies were terminated and political activities became a more central focus.

During the Cultural Revolution, trains were made available to students for travel and "linking up" with the people of China. Hongtu used the opportunity to travel west to Xinjiang and then to Guangzhou. However, the government found the "linking up" program to be unmanageable and the program was ended. So Hongtu and five friends, including artist Yu Youhan, used the historical "Long March" as a model, crossing the countryside by foot and using their art on behalf of the current political movement. They marched north to the Jinggang Mountains in the Jiangxi province. This place was where Mao's first organization activities for the Chinese Communist Party began. From there, the group traveled to Mao's birthplace at Shaoshan, carrying flags and a portrait of Chairman Mao.

By the time they returned to Beijing, the Cultural Revolution had begun to have serious repercussions for the Zhang family. Hongtu was criticized for his bad family background and his interest in Western art. He was then prohibited from painting Mao's portrait. Looking back on his long march, Zhang Hongtu has said: "Nobody bothered me at that time about my family background. It was nice to see the landscape, so nice for a city boy. But after this trip, I changed a lot. The bad part is, I saw people kill each other, literally. I began to ask, 'Is this really the Cultural Revolution?' I saw people put so many books all together like a hill and then burn them. I saw so many poor people, it was beyond my imagination. The reality of it didn't fit my imagination of the Cultural Revolution. I got back and instead of being a participant, I became an 'escapist'." In Beijing, his home was searched for materials against the revolutionary movement. His trust in Mao and Mao's writings slowly turned into sentiments of betrayal.

Looking back on the Cultural Revolution, Zhang Hongtu has said, "I had to criticize my own painting... One friend who was so good toward me but really was just spying checked out my diary without telling me, to see how badly I hated the Communist Party. He found nothing and said so, but I was so hurt. After that, I couldn't write anything. That was the worst result of the Cultural Revolution. To this day, people don't trust each other, don't think about the future, just think about themselves and find security only in making money. That's hard to change now, and most people in my generation just don't want to talk about the Cultural Revolution."

Although Hongtu's education was brought to an end in 1966, his class still officially graduated and was sent to the countryside near Shijiazhuang to work in the rice fields. The last two years they spend in the fields, they were allowed to produce art on Sundays and stored their painting tools and materials in the baskets used for collecting cow dung. They became known as the "Dung Basket School of Painting." In 1972, the class was assembled and given their diplomas – belatedly. A year after receiving his diploma, Zhang Hongtu was assigned work in the Beijing Jewelry Import-Export Company.

=== Transition to the United States ===
After Zhang Hongtu was assigned to work with the Beijing Jewelry Import-Export Company, he spent nine years doing professional jewelry design. In 1981, Zhang suggested to his supervisors that they send him to the Buddhist cave paintings at Dunhuang to gather design ideas for jewelry making. He has suggested that the twenty-nine days he spent in Dunhuang making copies of the paintings became very important to his later artworks.

Zhang Hongtu did most of his artwork on Sunday evenings, dabbling in still-life drawings, landscapes, and paintings from models. In 1979, he joined the "Contemporaries" art group, Tongdai Ren. Their group was the first to exhibit their works at the National Art Gallery in June 1980 and included mostly landscapes and portraits. The attention he received for his works at the exhibition led Zhang to request permission to change jobs, but his file would not be released by the Jewelry Company. For the sake of his work, Zhang Hontu resolved to leave the country. In three days, the jewelry design company gave him permission to travel to New York City and study at the Art Students League.

It was two years before Zhang Hongtu's family was able to follow him to the United States. He worked construction jobs, painting walls for a meager $50 per day. It took two years for him to sell two paintings, the second painting providing some encouragement to the struggling artist for its $1800 pay check by the World Bank in Washington, D.C. But Zhang Hongtu's career in the Western world didn't really take off until 1987, when he painted a portrait of Chairman Mao onto a Quaker Oats box; an act that would eventually transform into part of Hongtu's famous Long Live Chairman Mao Series.

== "Political Pop" (late 1980s to 1990s) ==
In 1987, Zhang Hongtu took brush and paint to a Quaker Oats box. One day, while eating oatmeal for breakfast, it occurred to him that there was a resemblance between Mr. Quaker and Chairman Mao. The idea of Chairman Mao's presence being so inescapable, even in his life in the United States, and that with just a few brushstrokes, the face of an American icon could become a Chinese icon, marks an important shift in Hongtu's artistic development. This was the birth of his Long Live Chairman Mao Series

This particular artwork became one of the first of China's "political pop" movement that helped launch Contemporary Chinese painting into its current popularity. "Political Pop" refers to artworks that appropriate the visual tropes of propaganda (specifically the Cultural Revolution) and reworks them into the Western "pop art" style. It marked the beginning of what Jerome Silbergeld notes as "a long romance between Chinese and Western icons" in Zhang Hongtu's work.

Shortly after the Events at Tiananmen Square in 1989, Zhang Hongtu painted the Last Banquet, which satirized Chairman Mao's deification and the revered writings of the Little Red Book. A senatorial group sponsored an exhibition in the Russell Rotunda in Washington D.C. as a response to the events at Tiananmen Square and Zhang Hongtu submitted Last Banquet for the exhibition. Senator Edward Kennedy of Massachusetts declared the artwork as "sacrilegious" and barred it from the exhibition. According to Silbergeld, "Zhang had come full circle, censored at an American exhibition protesting censorship in China." Zhang pulled out of the exhibit and his fellow artists followed his lead. Consequently, though originally priced at $4000, Last Banquet was sold five years later for $50,000.

Both the Long Live Chairman Mao Series and the Last Banquet set the stage for his later works, which reached back into his personal history. Many of these works took influences from his experiences as a Muslim outsider in China and his "otherness" in the United States. Zhang's works reflect on authority and belief; about the power of icons. His icons are meant to reach across cultural boundaries and to "offend all audiences equally." About the walls between cultures, Zhang Hongtu has said, "In my art, I try to make a way through the wall, to put a door, a hole in the wall, by using Western art with my own art. There's a Chinese saying, 'You can't breed a horse with a cow'. My work is the opposite, like 'Daring to breed the horse with the cow'.

Chairman Mao was not the only cultural icon portrayed in Zhang's artwork. In a series of cut-outs from the early 1990s, he also includes images of Buddha, the crucifixion of Christ, the cross, the holy trinity, ionic columns, traditional Chinese book bound with thread, and the Great Wall. In his deconstruction of cultural icons, Zhang Hongtu has used cutouts and contrast. He cuts images out, turning positives into negatives and solids into voids. In so doing, the artist criticizes commonly held value judgements of high and low and the distinction between them. These unfilled images are surrounded by materials such as oil, rice, grass, MSG, soy sauce, cement, nails and corns etc. The conflicting image of emptiness and basic, raw surrounding substances have attributed in his success in creating tension. This tension has caused viewers to think about the contrasting relationships between 'high and low', 'common and grand' and 'reality and illusion.'

Importantly, Zhang Hongtu does not provide answers to the issues his artworks raise about globalization, 'East and West', 'high and low', and elite culture from the museum to mass culture. Instead, they provoke the viewer to question and to think about the issues from different cultural and societal perspectives.

== Landscape paintings ==
Zhang Hongtu's most recent artworks examine the relationship between the "East and West" in landscape paintings. He began producing oil paintings in the late 1990s, using compositions of Chinese landscapes and executed them in the styles of European Impressionists. The series explores the nature of modernism and the artistic encounter between China and the West. Repainting Shanshui is a series that Zhang Hongtu began in 1998 to explore the parody of values and conventions of Chinese and Western art.

== Selected artworks ==
=== Long Live Chairman Mao Series #29 (1989) ===
Acrylic and Quaker Oats Box 24.4 x 12.7 x 12.7 cm

In 1987, Zhang Hongtu first took his paintbrush to a Quaker Oats box, changing the iconic Western figure into the iconic Chinese figure of Chairman Mao. He transplanted the omnipresent image of Chairman Mao into a parody Western logo. For Zhang, the image of Chairman Mao seemed ubiquitous, and with just a few brushstrokes he was able to juxtapose Western and Eastern cultures in a humorous critique. This artwork is seen as one of the first "political pop" artworks from a Chinese artist. The Saatchi Gallery, which housed an exhibition of Zhang Hongtu's work, notes that "The uncanny resemblance between communist leader and puritan farmer ironically confuses propaganda, religion, and ideology with the kitsch of advertising and cult of personality; like Elvis and Jesus, once you start looking Mao can be found everywhere." Thus, the image expands cross-culturally, suggesting the pervasiveness of Mao's international legacy.

=== The Last Banquet (1989) ===
60 x 168 The pages of the "Little Red Book" and acrylic

After the Tiananmen Square Massacre in 1989, Zhang Hongtu's reacted through the production of artworks. In The Last Banquet, Zhang recreated Leonardo da Vinci's The Last Supper to criticize the social and political banquets of Mao's China.

The Last Banquet was going to be exhibited by the Congressional Human Rights Foundation in Washington, D.C. to mark the first anniversary of the Tiananmen Square Massacre. The painting was rejected because it "offended Christian values."

The painting was intended to be a satire about the deification of Chairman Mao, surrounded by disciples who made themselves in his image.

== Selected exhibitions ==
2004

Selected work, William Holland & Drury Gallery, Marlboro College, Vermont

2003

Icon & Innovations: The Cross-Cultural Art of Zhang Hongtu, The Gibson Gallery, State University of New York at Potsdam

2002

Paris-Pekin, Espace Cardin, Paris

ConversASIAN, National Gallery, Cayman Island

2000

New Paintings, Cheryl McGinnis Gallery, New York

1996

Soy Sauce, Lipstick, Charcoal, Hong Kong University of Science and Technology

Chairmen Mao, Groton School, Massachusetts

1995

Zhang Hongtu: Material Mao, The Bronx Museum of the Arts, New York

1994

The Fifth Biennial of Havana, Cuba

Small World - Small Works, Galerie + Edition Caoc, Berlin, Germany

1982

The Spirit of Dunhuang, Asian Arts Institute, New York
