= Li Shuang =

Li Shuang may refer to:

- Li Shuang (artist) (born 1957), Chinese contemporary artist
- Li Shuang (badminton), Chinese-Turkish badminton player
- Li Shuang (field hockey) (born 1978), Chinese field hockey player
- Li Shuang (snowboarder) (born 1992), Chinese snowboarder
