= Yan Li (artist) =

Chinese poet and artist (1954–2026)

- 严力
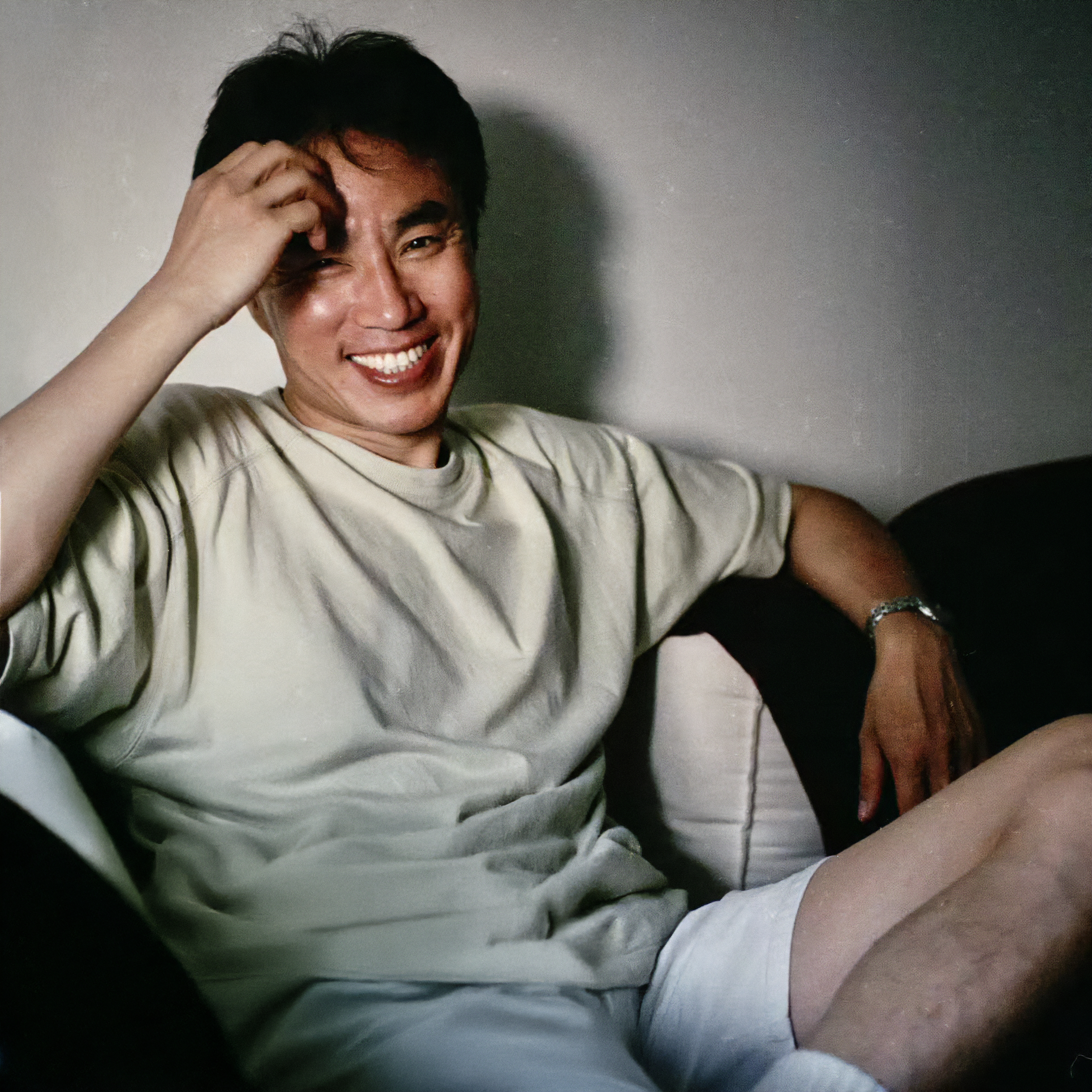
- Yan Li in 1999, photographed by Yu Jie
- Born: 1954; Beijing, China
- Died: June 24, 2026 (aged 71–72); New York City, U.S.
- Occupations: Poet; painter; journal editor
- Known for: Misty Poetry; Stars Art Group; First Line
- Website: yanli.art

Yan Li (Chinese: 严力; pinyin: Yán Lì; 1954–2026) was a Chinese poet, painter, journal editor, and cultural organizer. He was a member of the Stars Art Group, a contemporary Chinese art collective. He was a representative figure of the Misty Poets movement and a member of the literary circle centered on the unofficial journal Jintian (Today). In 1984, he held one of the earliest post-1949 solo exhibitions of avant-garde art in mainland China, at the People's Park Exhibition Hall in Shanghai. Yan worked across poetry, painting, and fiction, treating them as distinct but related forms of expression.

After moving to New York City in 1985, Yan founded the Chinese-language poetry and art journal First Line (Chinese: Yihang, 《一行》) in 1987 and served as its first editor-in-chief. The journal was a platform for contemporary Chinese poetry, translations of American poetry, and visual art, connecting literary and artistic circles in China and abroad. After its original print and online runs ended in the early 2000s, the journal was revived on WeChat in 2018 and returned to print in New York as First Line New York in 2020. From 2009 to 2015, he co-organized the Beijing Mid-Autumn International Poetry Festival at the China Millennium Monument, which featured poets from more than a dozen countries. Beginning in 2018, he served as co-chair of the Flushing Poetry Festival in New York and organized poetry readings and international literary exchanges. Yan published poetry, fiction, essays, and art catalogues, and exhibited his work in Asia, North America, and Europe. His visual works are held in museum collections including the Shanghai Art Museum, the Fukuoka Asian Art Museum, and the Long Museum.

== Early life and artistic beginnings ==
Yan was born in Beijing in 1954. He began writing poetry in 1973 and became involved with the unofficial literary journal Jintian (Today) in 1978. The following year, he began painting and joined the Stars Art Group. Yan participated in the inaugural Stars Art Exhibition in 1979, first held outside the National Art Museum of China and later shown at Huafangzhai in Beihai Park. He also participated in the group's second exhibition at the National Art Museum of China in 1980. In 1984, Yan held one of the earliest solo exhibitions of avant-garde art in mainland China after 1949 at the People's Park Exhibition Hall in Shanghai.

== New York and First Line ==
In 1985, Yan moved from Beijing to New York to study abroad at his own expense. In May 1987, he founded the Chinese-language poetry and art journal First Line (Chinese: Yihang, 《一行》) and served as its editor-in-chief. The journal featured contemporary Chinese poetry, translations of American poetry, and visual art, and circulated within independent poetry circles in China. Through the journal, Yan played a role in internationalizing the Chinese poetry scene.

Beginning in the 1990s, Yan divided his time between China and the United States, later living and working between Shanghai and New York. After twenty-five issues, First Line ended its original print run in 2000 and continued online until 2003. Yan revived the journal on WeChat in 2018. In July 2020, it returned to print in New York under the title First Line New York.

== Literary career ==
Although Yan was associated with Misty Poetry, his poetry has also been described as displaying features characteristic of the transition to Third Generation poetry. His poetry often approached philosophical and social questions with lightness and irony, using brief images, comparisons, and shifts of perspective. English translations of his poems appeared in literary journals including Modern Poetry in Translation, Tupelo Quarterly, and Queen's Quarterly. His 1986 poem "Give It Back to Me" (《还给我》) became one of his best-known works.

In his later work, Yan developed the series Poetry Chewing Gum (《诗歌口香糖》). The short, epigrammatic poems used humor and irony to address everyday life, consumer culture, and globalization. The series received the Qinling Literature Prize in 2011.

His later poetry collections included The Moon Within the Body (《体内的月亮》) and Sorrow Should Have Grown Up by Now (《悲哀也该成人了》), both published in 2016.

Yan also published fiction and prose. His fiction included New York Is Not Heaven (《纽约不是天堂》, 1993), Sleeping with New York (《與紐約共枕》, 1993), and The Highest Funeral (《最高的葬禮》, 1998). A selection of his fiction was published as Selected Fiction of Yan Li (《严力小说精选集》) in 2024.

== Visual art ==
Yan treated poetry, painting, and fiction as distinct but related forms, choosing among them according to the subject. His visual practice centered on painting, mixed-media works, and works on paper; it also included photography. Some of his visual works were closely connected to poems or poetic ideas. His recurring series included Record, Patching, Brick, and Fire, among others. He began the Record series in New York in 1987, incorporating discarded vinyl records into paintings and mixed-media works; a 1991 feature in The New York Times reproduced a photograph of Yan with works from the series.

Soon after arriving in New York, Yan held a solo exhibition at Sabrina Fung Gallery in 1985. A 1986 review in The New York Times reproduced his painting Growing From Young Plant (1984) as the article's sole illustration. In 1987, his work was shown at the Fairbank Center for Chinese Studies at Harvard University and at Sarah Lawrence College; a review of the latter exhibition in The New York Times reproduced his work Record. His work was also included in the Stars Art Group's tenth-anniversary touring exhibitions in Hong Kong, Taipei, Paris, and Dunkirk in 1989. In 1993, he held a solo exhibition of photography in Beijing.

His early work was included in later historical exhibitions, including the Stars Art Group retrospective Origin Point at Today Art Museum in 2007 and Blooming in the Shadows: Unofficial Chinese Art, 1974–1985 at China Institute Gallery in 2011. A 2018 retrospective at the Lingang Contemporary Art Museum in Shanghai surveyed his work from 1978 to 2018. In 2019, his work was included in Symbiosis: The Intertextuality of Art and Poetry at OCAT Shenzhen. His work is held in the collections of the Shanghai Art Museum, the Fukuoka Asian Art Museum, and the Long Museum.

== Cultural organizing and international activities ==
In 1996, Yan participated in the international symposium Breaking the Barriers: Chinese Literature Facing the World in Sweden. The symposium proceedings, published by the Olof Palme International Center, included his contribution "Illusionary Space Writing." From 2009 to 2015, he co-organized the Beijing Mid-Autumn International Poetry Festival at the China Millennium Monument, which featured poets from more than a dozen countries. Beginning in 2018, he served as co-chair of the Flushing Poetry Festival. In June 2018, he was elected president of the PEN Chinese Writers Abroad Centre (CWAC), a New York-based center of PEN International. He also took part in international literary programs and festivals, including the International Writing Program at the University of Iowa and the Struga Poetry Evenings. His literary activities in New York included readings at Columbia University and The Poetry Project.

== Death ==
Yan died in New York City on 24 June 2026 following an illness.

== Selected publications ==
=== Poetry ===
- Yan, Li (1991). 這首詩可能還不錯 [This Poem May Not Be So Bad] (in Traditional Chinese). Taipei: Shulin Publishing Company. ISBN 9789575861155.
- Yan, Li (1993). Poet's Life. Seattle: Poetry Around Press.
- Yan, Li (1993). Maker of Dusk (《黄昏制造者》) (in Chinese). Nanjing: Nanjing University Press. ISBN 978-7-305-02120-6.
- Yan, Li (1995). 严力诗选 [Selected Poems of Yan Li] (in Chinese). Shanghai: Shanghai Literature and Art Publishing House. ISBN 9787532113330.
- Yan, Li (1999). Rotating Polyhedral Mirror (《多面镜旋转体》) (in Chinese). Xining: Qinghai People's Publishing House. ISBN 978-7-225-01761-7.
- Yan, Li (n.d.). Poetry Possibility (《诗歌的可能性》) (in Chinese and English). Brooklyn, New York: First Line. ISBN 978-1-928552-13-0.
- Yan, Li (2016). 体内的月亮 [The Moon Within the Body] (in Chinese). Beijing: 作家出版社. ISBN 9787506384612.
- Yan, Li (2016). 悲哀也该成人了 [Sorrow Should Have Grown Up by Now] (in Chinese). Hangzhou: 浙江文艺出版社. ISBN 9787533944704.

=== Fiction and prose ===
- Yan, Li (1993). 纽约不是天堂 [New York Is Not Heaven] (in Chinese). Beijing: 华艺出版社. ISBN 9787800397868.
- Yan, Li (1993). Sleeping with New York (《與紐約共枕》) (in Traditional Chinese). Taipei: Linking Publishing Company. ISBN 978-957-08-1080-6.
- Yan, Li (1998). 最高的葬禮 [The Highest Funeral] (in Traditional Chinese). Hong Kong: 田園書屋. ISBN 9789623390392.
- Yan, Li (2002). 母语的遭遇 [Encounter with the Mother Tongue] (in Chinese). Shanghai: 上海文艺出版社. ISBN 9787532123216.
- Yan, Li (2002). 遭遇9·11 [Encountering 9/11] (in Chinese). Shanghai: 上海文艺出版社. ISBN 9787532123926.
- Yan, Li (2024). 严力小说精选集 [Selected Fiction of Yan Li] (in Chinese). I Wing Press Inc. ISBN 9781940742519.

=== Art books and catalogues ===
- Yan, Li (2000). Patching Begins with New Millennium and Myself (《從我開始修補的新世紀》) (in Chinese and English). New York. Presented by U.S. Digest Magazine; printed by Expedi Printing Inc.
- Yan, Li (2005). 事物是它们自己的象征 [Things Are Symbols of Themselves] (in Chinese). Tehran: Ostoore Publications. ISBN 9789648332285.
- Yan, Li (2018). Contemporary Poetic: My 40 Years: Works of Yan Li (《诗意当代：我与我的40年——严力绘画个展》) (in Chinese and English). Exhibition catalogue. Shanghai: Lingang Contemporary Art Museum.

== Selected exhibitions ==
- 1979–1980 – The first and second Stars Art Exhibitions, held outside the National Art Museum of China and at Huafangzhai in Beihai Park in 1979, and at the National Art Museum of China in 1980, Beijing.
- 1984 – Solo exhibition, People's Park Exhibition Hall, Shanghai.
- 1985 – Solo exhibition, Sabrina Fung Gallery, New York.
- 1986 – Avant-Garde Chinese Art: Beijing/New York, City Gallery, New York, and Vassar College Art Gallery, Poughkeepsie, New York.
- 1987 – Group exhibitions at the Fairbank Center for Chinese Studies at Harvard University, Cambridge, Massachusetts, and at Sarah Lawrence College, Bronxville, New York.
- 1989 – The Stars: Ten Years, touring exhibition in Hong Kong, Taipei, Paris, and Dunkirk.
- 2007 – Origin Point—“Star Group” Retrospective Exhibition, Today Art Museum, Beijing.
- 2011 – Blooming in the Shadows: Unofficial Chinese Art, 1974–1985, China Institute Gallery, New York.
- 2017 – Salon, Salon: A Profile of Modern Art Practices from a Beijing Perspective, 1972–1982, Inside-Out Art Museum, Beijing.
- 2018 – Contemporary Poetic: My 40 Years: Works of Yan Li, Lingang Contemporary Art Museum, Shanghai.
- 2019 – Symbiosis: The Intertextuality of Art and Poetry, OCAT Shenzhen, Shenzhen.
- 2019–2020 – Stars 1979, OCAT Institute, Beijing.

== Awards and honors ==
- 2005 – 2004 China Annual Best Poetry Award from Selected Poetry.
- 2011 – Qinling Literature Prize for the Poetry Chewing Gum series.
- 2019 – New York City Council proclamation honoring his service and contributions to Flushing, Queens, and New York City.
- 2019 – Lifetime Achievement Award marking the thirtieth anniversary of Poetry Reference.
- 2022 – First prize in the poetry category of the Overseas Chinese Writing Award for 100 Poems by Yan Li.
