= Li Shuang (artist) =

Chinese artist

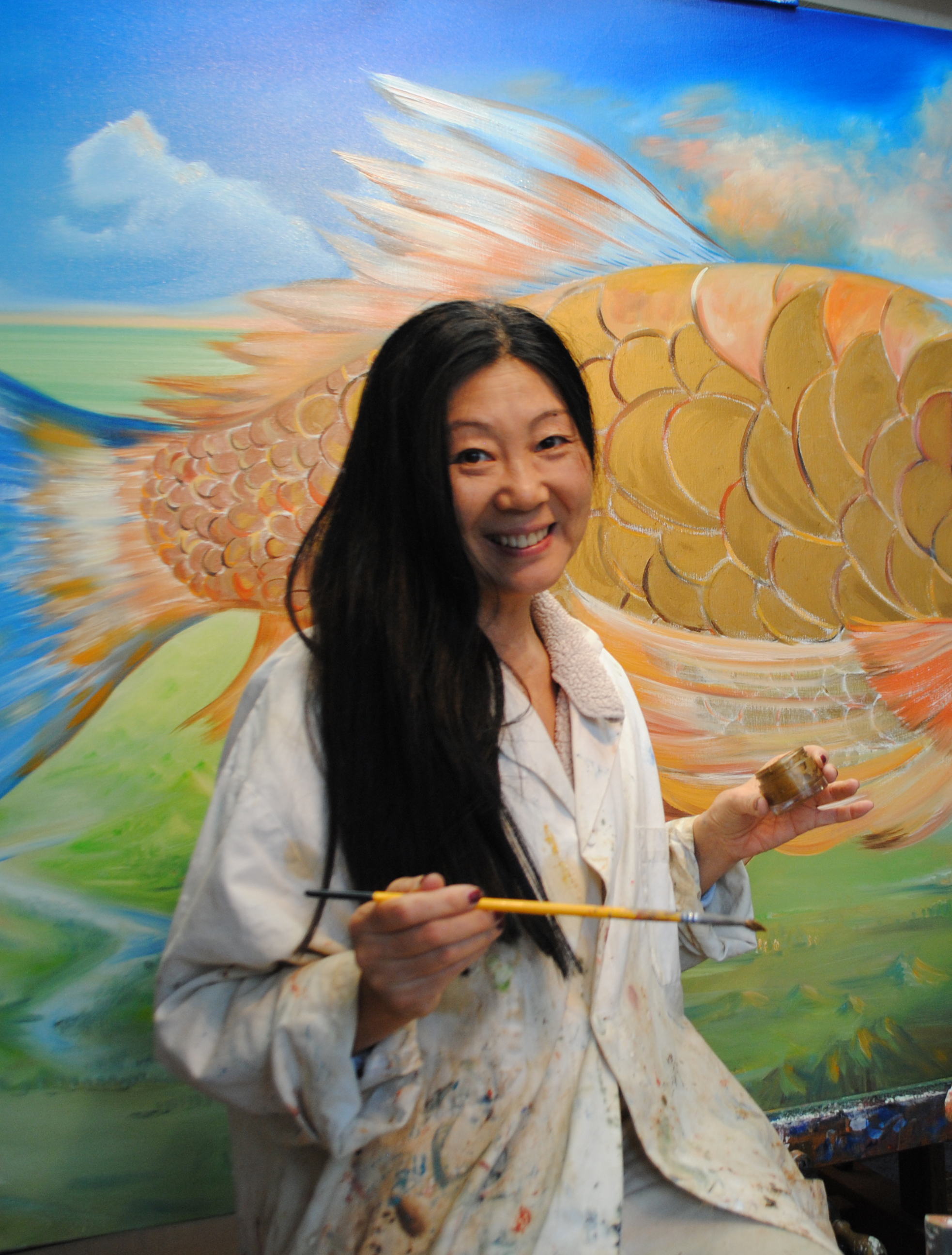
The artist in 2014

Li Shuang (李爽, born 1957 in Beijing) is a contemporary Chinese artist.

Li Shuang's works testify to her painful personal and artistic journey. She grew up in Beijing during the Cultural Revolution within a family of intellectuals. Her early childhood artistic development was influenced by her grandfather, a dealer in Chinese antiques, books, and art.

During the Chinese political reformation and opening up in the late ninetieth, “Li Shuang” was a household name in the art industry in France and other European countries. On a superficial level, the romantic story between Li and her husband might account for the reopening of art in isolated China due to Cultural Revolution. More specifically, Western media described “Li Shuang Incident” as the precursor and advocator of the emerging Chinese modern behavior art.

== Life ==
Li Shuang was born in Beijing in 1957 and grew up during the Cultural Revolution in a family of intellectuals. Her early artistic development was influenced by her grandfather, a dealer in Chinese antiques, books, and art.

At nineteen, Li was sent to work on a state farm in Shunyi, outside Beijing, where she continued painting and produced numerous landscape sketches. In 1977, she applied to the Beijing Film Academy but was not admitted. Later that year, after the director of stage design at the Beijing Youth Art Theatre saw her landscape paintings, she was hired as a stage designer and returned to Beijing.

=== The Stars ===
In 1979, together with Ma Desheng, Wang Keping, Huang Rui, Qu Leilei, Ah Cheng, Ai Weiwei, and Yan Li, Li Shuang was member of the Stars Art Group (星星 - Xīngxīng), a group of untrained, experimental artists who challenged the strict tenets of Chinese politics. As a political and artistic group, they staged exhibitions around Beijing, making way for avant-garde art in China. Li Shuang was the only female artist founder of the Stars. Li exhibited in both the historic shows of 1979 and 1980.

Her works were featured in all the Stars group shows, The Stars: Ten Years, 1989 (Hanart Gallery, Hong Kong and Taipei), Demand for Artistic Freedom, The Stars 20 Years, 2000 (Tokyo Gallery, Tokyo), and the retrospective exhibition in Beijing in 2007: Origin Point (Today Art Museum, Beijing). According to The New York Times, she was described as the most intellectual female artist in the era of post-Cultural Revolution in China.

=== Arrest ===
Because of her radical movement in art and politics, and her relationship with a French diplomat, Emmanuel Bellefroid, Li was arrested by the government and received a two-year sentence. This led to a political tension between China and France at the time. Later an agreement was made between the two countries and Li was released. This incident abolished the banned interracial marriage in China.

=== Exile ===
In 1984, Li decided to leave China and reside in Paris to pursue her study of art. She began to understand and analyze the western aesthetic tradition but remained true to her Chinese artistic roots. She has taken part in many group exhibitions, including a tenth-year reunion of the Stars Group in Hong Kong in 1989, another Stars exhibition in Tokyo in 2000, and a retrospective exhibition in Beijing in 2007. She has also exhibited at many shows in her own right in galleries worldwide, including Paris, Amsterdam, New York, San Francisco, Singapore, Hong Kong, Shanghai and Beijing, and her works have been sold at auction by Sotheby's and Christie's. In March 2010, Dialogue Space in Beijing opened Li Shuang's solo exhibition “Butterfly Dream”, presenting spiritual works inspired by Zhuangzi's Taoist classic.

== Art ==
Li Shuang believes Chinese art is a spiritual movement of the heart - Chinese paintings come from the heart, while Western paintings concentrate on the scene.

In the 70's Li Shuang's art work mainly focused on village view painting, including street, mountain and houses, using ink pan and pastel. In the 80's and 90's, Li's art shifted her idea to a very wild range, such as portrait, furniture, animal, plant and so on. Each painting would have a center color and other accessory colors which was able to convey the different mood and thoughts of the artist.

As the French critic Michel Nuridsany wrote: "While the Chinese art world is going through a phase of unrestrained modernity, Li Shuang’s oeuvre is striking for its lack both of contemporary references and of all sense of febrile haste and by its intensity. This is because her art developed separately from the Chinese context, which encouraged a style of painting which reached its apogee in 1999-2000 – a style which in no way reflected her own experiences. Her strongest advantage has been her silence. Her aura. But first and foremost, her admirable sense of light."

== Exhibitions ==
Li Shuang began showing her work in China as early as 1979 at the Stars exhibit at the Huafangzhai Gallery in Beijing. Her paintings have appeared in various exhibitions worldwide, including San Francisco, New York, Paris, Amsterdam, Singapore, Hong Kong, Shanghai, and Beijing.

1984 J&J Donguy Gallery, Paris, France

1985 James Mayor Gallery, Paris, France

1986 Pontius Gallery, Mountain View, CA. Ingrid's Gallery, Los Angeles, CA

1987 Clarisses's Gallery, Charolles, France

1989 Art & Communication Gallery, Paris, France

1990 Municipal Museum, Vervins, France

1991 Saint Aignan, Ex_prevote, France

1995 Bellefroid Gallery, Paris, France

2000 Leda Fletcher Gallery, Geneva, Switzerland

2002 Leda Fletcher Gallery, Geneva, Switzerland

2003 De Arte Gallery, Nantes, France

2004 Galerie du Monde, Hong Kong. Cathy Gallery, Paris, France. Galerie du Triangle, Lyon, France.

2005 Galerie du Triangle, Lyon, France. DeArte Gallery, Nantes, France

2006 Linda Museum, Beijing, China. Galerie du Triangle, Lyon, France

2007 Galerie du Triangle, Lyon, France. Linda Gallery, Singapore. Cathy Gallery, Paris, France

2008 “Return of Light” Willem Kerseboom Gallery, Amsterdam, Netherlands

2009 Li Shuang's collages Galerie du Triangle, Lyon, France

2010 “The Butterfly Dream” Dialogue Space, Today Art Museum, Beijing, China

== Auctions ==
1996 China Guardian, Beijing, October 1996, 22,000 CNY, oil and college on canvas

2002 Cornette De Saint Cyr, Paris Drouot, February 27, 2002, 3,500 €, oil on canvas

2003 China Guardian, Beijing, November 25, 2003, 41,800 CNY, oil on canvas

2005 Sotheby's, Hong Kong, October 24, 2005, 276,000 HKS, oil on canvas

2006 China Guardian, Beijing, November 22, 2006, 285,000 CNY, oil on canvas

2007 Bukowski's, Stockholm, April 27, 2007, 16,900 €, oil on canvas

2007 Artcurial, 20th Century Chinese Art, Paris, June 5, 2007, 1080 €

2007 Artcurial, Paris, June 5, 2007, 16,100 €, oil on canvas

2007 Sotheby's, New York, March 25, 2007, US$17,000, oil on canvas

2008 Zhongcheng, Taiwan, June 8, 2008, US$31,700, oil on canvas

2008 Sotheby's, New York, March 17, 2008, US$12,500, oil and paper

2009 Xileng, Hangzhou, China, January 3, 2009, 168,000 CNY, oil and canvas

2009 Ravenel, Taiwan, June 7, 2009, US$19,800, oil and canvas

2010 China Guardian, May 15, 2010, 134.400 CNY, oil on canvas
