= Sui Jianguo =

Chinese contemporary artist (born 1965)

- 隋建國
- Education: Shandong Institute of Fine Arts (1984); Central Academy of Fine Arts (MA, 1989)
- Known for: Sculpture
- Notable work: Earth Force; Legacy Mantle (Mao Jacket); Red Dinosaurs / Made in China; Blind Portraits

Sui Jianguo (Chinese: 隋建國) born 1956) is a Chinese sculptor and professor at the Central Academy of Fine Arts (CAFA) in Beijing, where he was formerly chairman of the Department of Sculpture. He is best known for his series of sculptures based on the Mao suit and for a series of painted dinosaur figures. His work has been shown in China, Europe, Australia, and the United States.

== Early life and education ==
Sui was born in Qingdao, China in 1956. Both of his parents were factory workers, and he has said they were often absent during his early childhood because of their working hours. When Sui was ten, the Cultural Revolution started and all colleges were closed. He began working in a factory when he was sixteen, with his mother taking an early retirement as a condition for the job. In an interview he described growing up in a period of Mao Zedong worship in which Mao was "virtually a God at home".

Sui's artistic career did not start until he was eighteen, when a broken arm event took him away from the factory's physical work. He has said he used this time to think about his future, and, with his family's full support, he began studying Chinese painting in his spare time. After returning to the job, he was recruited into the propaganda group, often making poster paintings of political subjects in the socialist realist style. His first work that he regards as a true artwork was a traditional Chinese landscape painting completed in 1976, the year Mao died.

Following the political and educational reforms of the late 1970s, Sui studied sculpture at the Shandong Institute of Fine Arts in Jinan, graduating in 1984 (now Shandong University of Art & Design). He then began graduate study in the sculpture department of the Central Academy of Fine Arts in Beijing in 1986 and received a master's degree in 1989. Sui has said he chose sculpture partly because colleagues in the factories had told him he had "skill in using his hands".

== Career ==
After completing his master's degree, Sui took a faculty position in the Sculpture Department at CAFA and started building his own artistic style and portfolio while fulfilling his teaching responsibilities. From this point on, he began frequent traveling abroad to the Netherlands, Japan, Taiwan, Australia, and elsewhere to exhibit his work, and worked as a guest professor or speaker at several universities outside China. He later became chairman of the Department of Sculpture at CAFA.

His early sculptures in the 1990s used rock, boulders, and steel and were exhibited internationally. His Mao suit sculptures, which he began making in 1997, attracted wider attention, including interest from collectors such as Uli Sigg. In 1999, he participated in the Les Champs de la Sculpture exhibition on the Avenue des Champs-Élysées in Paris as the sole sculptor representing mainland China, marking a key milestone in presenting his work on the international stage.

In 2008 a large Mao Jacket sculpture was shown in New York City. In 2012 his work Discus Thrower was shown at the British Museum in London, and in 2014–15 the Public Art Fund presented his Blind Portraits in New York. A retrospective, ''Dimensions Indefinitely Variable: Sui Jianguo 1974 to 2024'', was held at the TAG Art Museum in Qingdao from November 2024 to February 2025.

== Work ==
=== Materials and early work ===
Sui's early work frequently uses heavy materials such as stone and metal, and techniques including binding, sealing, and hammering. Works from the early 1990s include ''Land Depression'', in which large boulders are wrapped in nets of steel rope, and ''Sealed Memory'' (also translated ''Closed Memory''), a rock enclosed in a cabinet welded from steel plates. Sotheby's catalogue notes describe these as part of his "Structure Series" and relate images of confinement and imprisonment to them. Another early piece, Memory, is a wall of ground-down railway sleepers. Another notable early work from this period is Endurance (1996), which features 90,000 iron nails systematically puncturing two nine-meter industrial rubber conveyor belts, exploring physical endurance and structural tension.

A 2025 Taikang Art Museum event description characterises the early 1990s as a period in which Sui moved from academic figurative sculpture toward conceptual work, incorporating industrial materials and ready-made elements. Critics and curators have frequently connected his early work to his personal experience of confinement and pressure.

=== Earth Force ===
Earth Force was conceived in 1989, when Sui was experimenting with the symbolic and conceptual qualities of materials. He has said that his turn to rocks, a quieter material, followed the 1989 Tiananmen Square protests. The work consists of twenty-eight 100&nbsp;kg boulders, each bound in a web of ribbed steel, and was first shown in Beijing in 1994.

=== Mao Jackets ===
Sui's Mao Jackets, exhibited under the title Legacy Mantle, are among his best-known works. He began thinking about the Mao suit (also called the Sun Yat-sen suit) after visiting Sun Yat-sen's birthplace in August 1996, and the first completed version followed about a year later while he was in Australia on a fellowship. Most of the jackets are hollow, empty sculptures made in a range of sizes and materials; the series has been produced in steel, resin, and coloured plastic, among others. A 1997 clay version cast ten jackets, each given a shrine and decorated with Chinese characters and images. Sue Wang, writing for CAFA Art Info, described the series as using a satirical approach to the conflict between escape and repression.

Sui has said the jackets are less a criticism of the Maoist past than a means of conveying his own ideas and feelings about it, and that finishing the series gave him a sense of resolution. He told The San Francisco Chronicle: "I'm putting him to rest. This way I can grow up."

In 2008, as part of the Asia Society exhibition Art and China's Revolution, a ten-foot (about three-metre) Mao Jacket was displayed on the Park Avenue median at 70th Street in New York from September to mid-November, in cooperation with the New York City Department of Parks and Recreation. Asia Society Museum director Melissa Chiu said the jacket in Sui's work could be read as both nostalgic and critical of Mao's legacy. The sculpture was afterwards placed on loan to Bates College in Maine for a year, beginning in December 2008.

=== Dinosaurs and Made in China ===
Sui's Red Dinosaurs (also called the Jurassic Age series) address China's role as an exporter of manufactured goods. Many of the figures, which are usually made of fibreglass and can stand up to 310 cm tall, are stamped with the words "Made in China" on the torso. A 798 Art District text states that the stamp refers to economic relations; Sui has said he wants viewers to consider who makes a product, where it goes, and why. Some dinosaurs are shown caged. Asked about this, Sui said he saw China's economic expansion as having costs for the country, its environment, and its people, and that he did not want the figure to keep growing.

=== Discus Thrower ===
From 1 June to 9 September 2012, the British Museum displayed Sui Jianguo's Discus Thrower, his response to the museum's marble Townley Discobolus, a Roman copy of a Greek bronze original attributed to Myron. Sui said the work reflected his own move away from the education he received at the art academy and its socialist ideology toward a practice of his own.

=== Blind Portraits ===
Blind Portrait, NYC, 2014

Blind Portraits, begun in 2008, is a series of cast bronze sculptures enlarged from small clay models that Sui made while blindfolded. Four monumental works from the series were shown at Doris C. Freedman Plaza in Central Park, New York, from 28 October 2014 to 20 February 2015, Sui's first presentation of the series in the United States.

=== Planting Trace & Garden in the Data Clouds (2021–present) ===
In his recent practice from 2021 onward exemplified by the Planting Trace (Emptiness in Hands) series and the large-scale composite work Garden in the Data Clouds Sui has shifted toward 3D-printed resin and digital technologies, exploring ontological issues and bodily presence in contemporary sculpture.

== Exhibitions ==
=== Solo ===
- 2024–25: ''Dimensions Indefinitely Variable: Sui Jianguo 1974 to 2024'', TAG Art Museum, Qingdao
- 2021: Emptiness in Hand, 33 Contemporary Art Center, Guangzhou
- 2019: Echo of System: Sui Jianguo, 1997–2019, Minsheng Art Museum, Beijing; System: Sui Jianguo 2008–2018, OCAT Shenzhen
- 2017: Trace, Pace Beijing
- 2015: Touchable, Pace Beijing
- 2014–15: ''Blind Portraits'', Public Art Fund, Doris C. Freedman Plaza, New York
- 2012: Sui Jianguo's Discus Thrower, British Museum, London
- 2012: Sui Jianguo, Pace Beijing, 798, Beijing
- 2012: Restrained Power: Sui Jianguo's Work, Singapore
- 2011: ''The Hague Under Heaven – Sui Jianguo Sculpture'', Museum Beelden aan Zee, The Hague
- 2010: Made in China by Sui Jianguo, Art Issue Projects, Beijing
- 2009: Motion/Tension: New Work by Sui Jianguo
- 2008: Art Time Square, Hong Kong
- 2008: ''Revealing Traces'', Joyart, Beijing
- 2007: Dian Xue – Sui Jianguo Art Works, OCAT, Shanghai
- 2007: ''Speeding Up – Sui Jianguo Space Video'', Arario, Beijing
- 2005: Sui Jianguo: The Sleep of Reason, Asian Art Museum, San Francisco
- 1999: ''Clothes Veins Study'', Passage Gallery, Beijing
- 1997: You Meet the Shadow of Hundred Years, Victoria College of the Arts, Melbourne
- 1996: Hanart Gallery, Hong Kong
- 1995: ''Deposit and Fault'', New Delhi Culture Center, India
- 1994: Hanart Gallery, Taipei
- 1994: ''Remembrance of Space'', CAFA Gallery, Beijing

=== Selected group ===
- 2019: The Allure of Matter: Material Art from China, Los Angeles County Museum of Art
- 2017: Rodin: L'Exposition du centenaire, Grand Palais, Paris
- 2013: Blickachsen 9, Bad Homburg, Germany
- 2012: Reactivation, 9th Shanghai Biennale, Power Station of Art; The Unseen, 4th Guangzhou Triennial, Guangdong Museum of Art
- 2009: Beijing–Havana: The Revolution of Art, National Museum of Fine Arts, Havana
- 2004: Le Moine et le Démon, Lyon Museum of Contemporary Art
- 2002: Paris–Pékin, Espace Cardin, Paris; Made in China, Wilhelm Lehmbruck Museum, Duisburg; 1st Guangzhou Triennial
- 2000: Shanghai Biennale; Lyon Biennale
- 1999: ''Les Champs de la Sculpture 2000'', Paris, France
- 1993: ''China's New Art, Post-1989'', Hong Kong Art Centre
