= Rabarama =

Italian sculptor

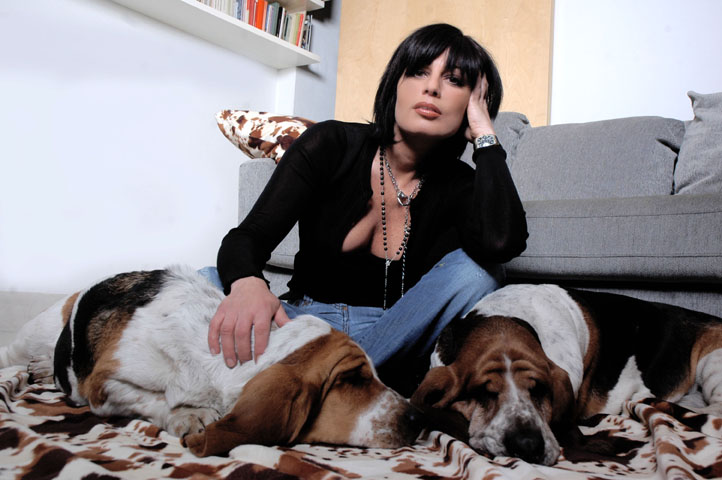
- Rabarama in 2006
- Born: Paola Epifani; Rome, Italy
- Education: Arts High School, Treviso; Academy of Fine Arts, Venice
- Known for: Performance, Drawing, Painting, Sculpture
- Notable work: monumental sculptures, sculptures, performances, paintings
- Movement: contemporary art
- Website: www.rabarama.com

Rabarama, pseudonym of Paola Epifani, (born August 22, 1969) is an Italian contemporary artist.

== Artistic practice ==
Rabarama creates sculptures and paintings of men, women and hybrid creatures, often in eccentric poses. The skins of her subjects are always decorated with patterns, symbols, letters, glyphs and other kind of figures, in a great variety of forms.

== Public art and internet art ==
Rabarama monumental sculptures have been exhibited in many public spaces

- Paris, Place de la Sorbonne, Rue Soufflot, Place du Pantheon
- Reggio Calabria, seaside
- Shanghai, People's Plaza
- Miami, Mizner Park
- Florence, Piazza Pitti- Giardino di Boboli-Giardino delle Scuderie Reali- Complesso Le Pagliere
- Cannes, La croisette

== Hi-tech and new media ==
In 2011 the world's first 360° video mapping on a sculpture was realized on a Rabarama's work called "Bozzolo" and exhibited live in Florence, Italy.

== Gallery ==
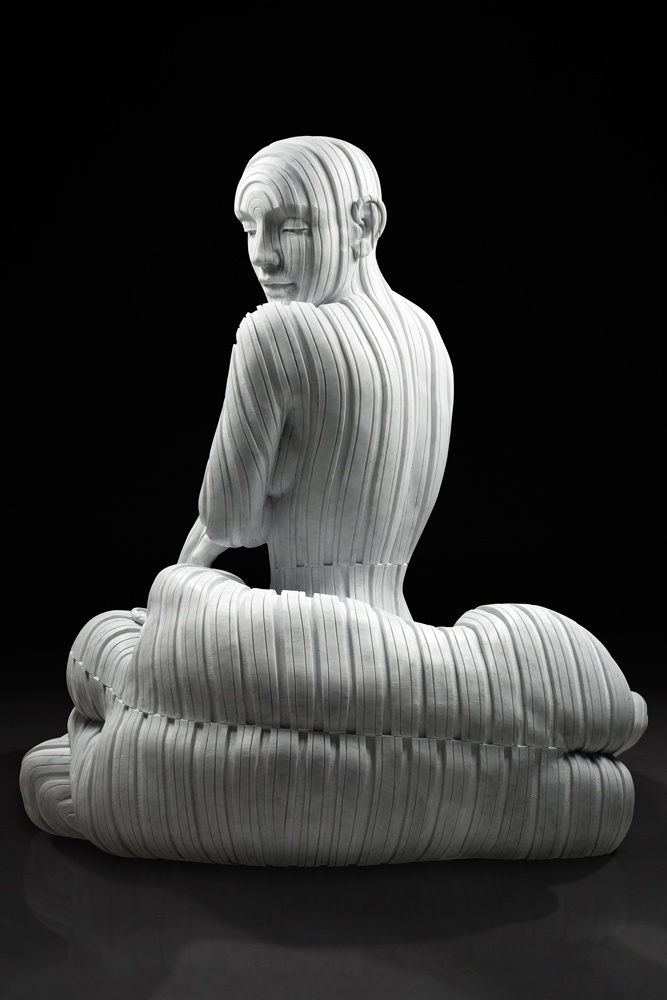
Abbandono

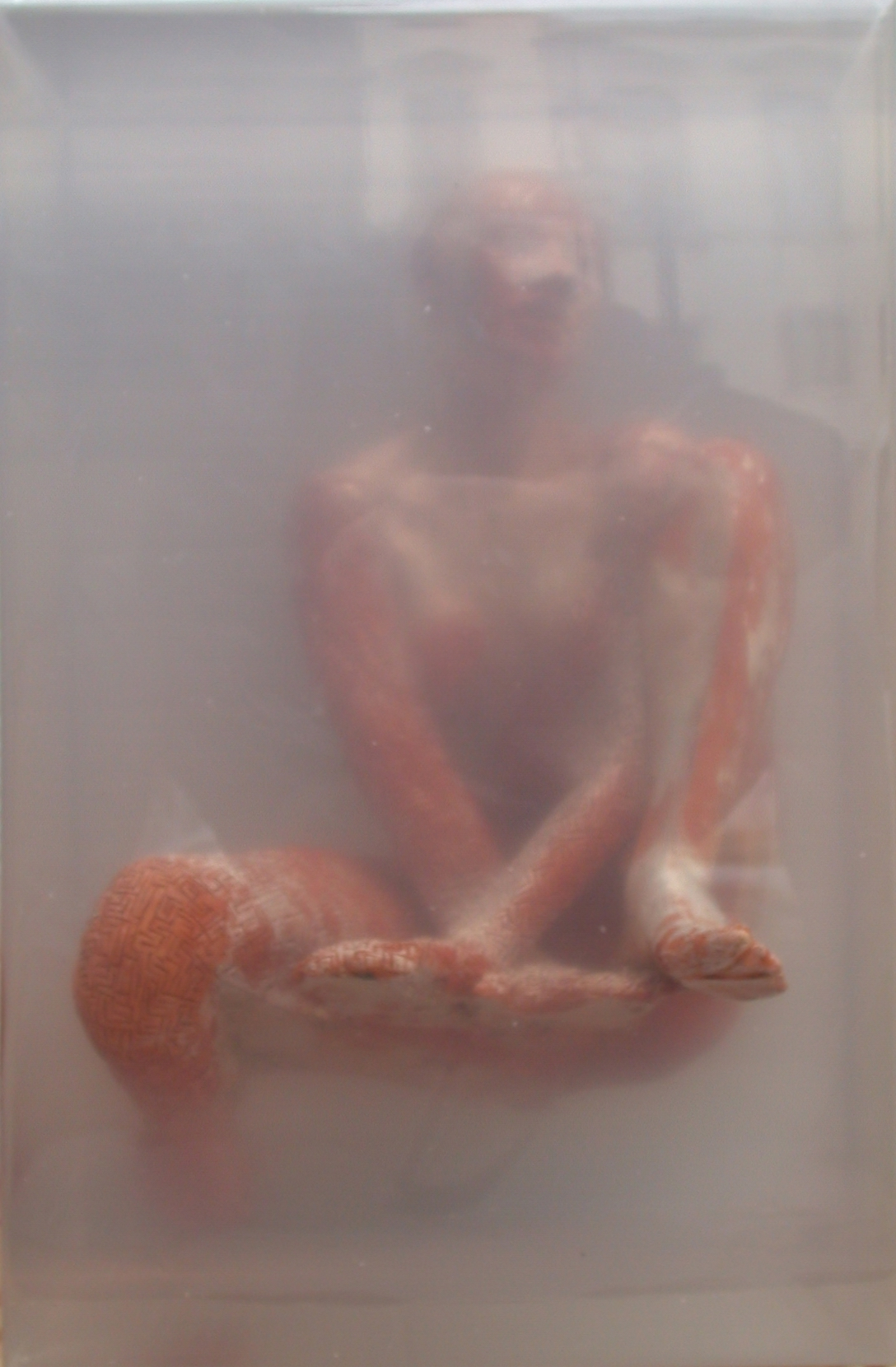
Crisalide

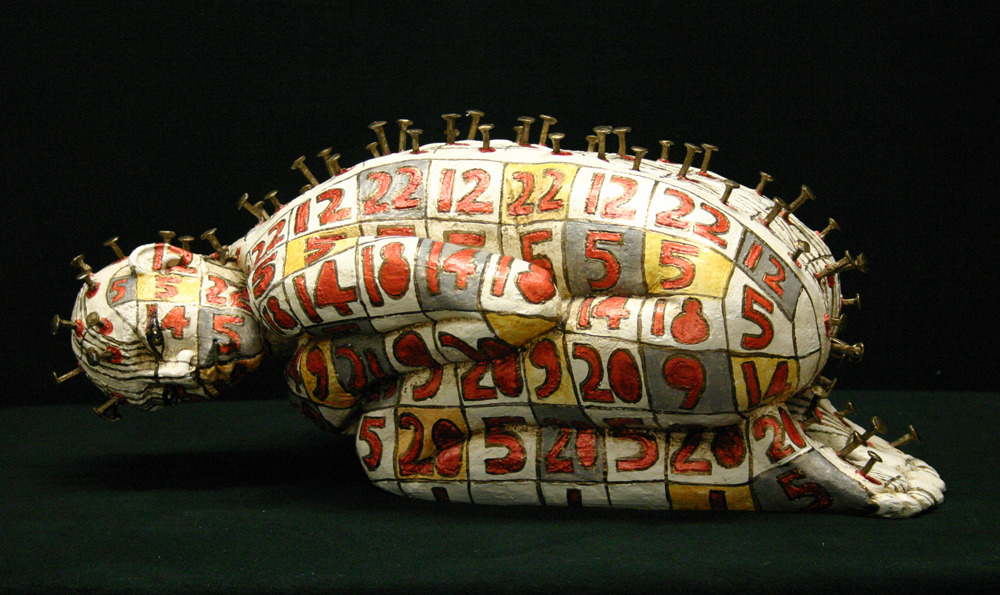
Do-si

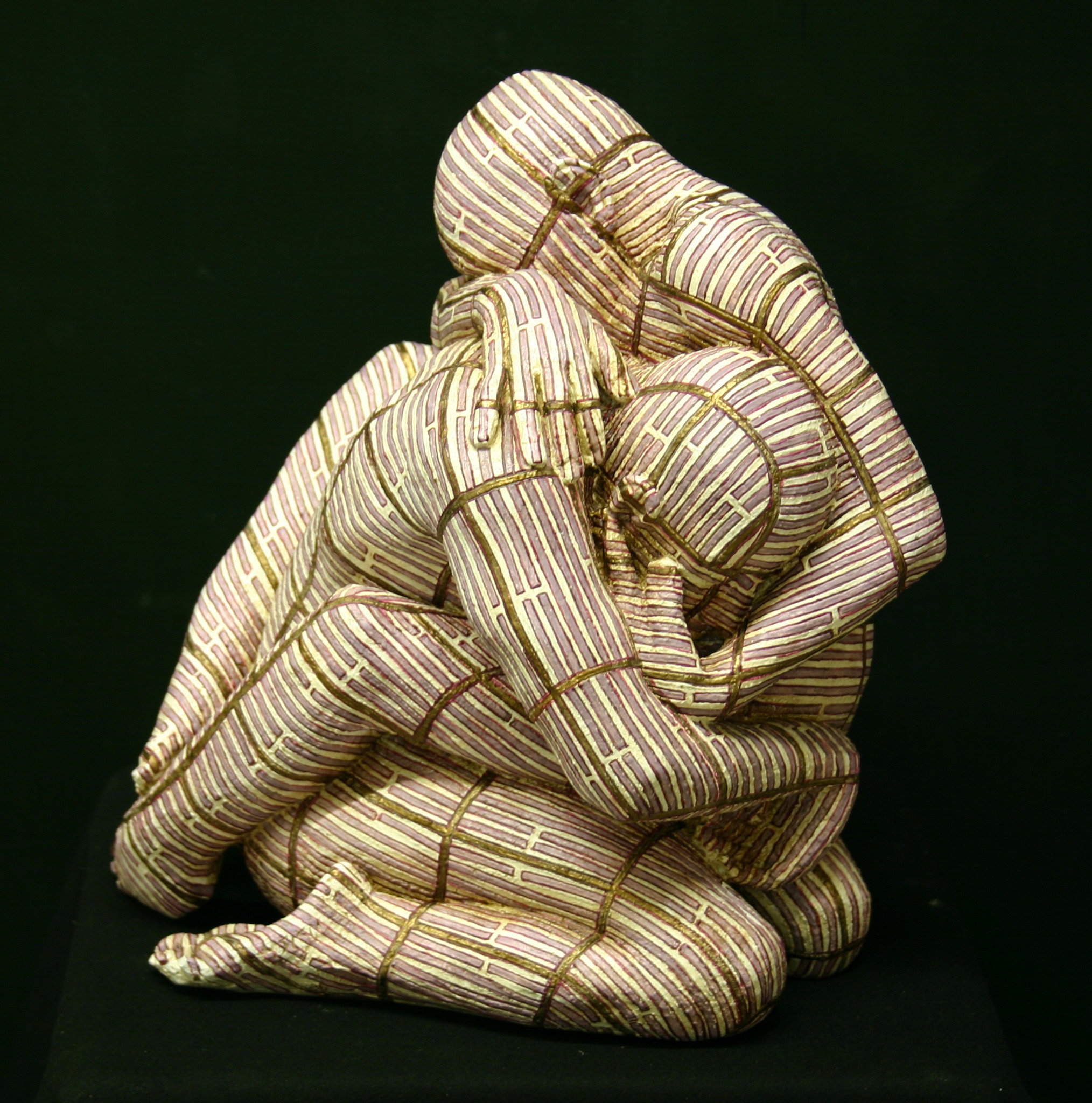
Hsien

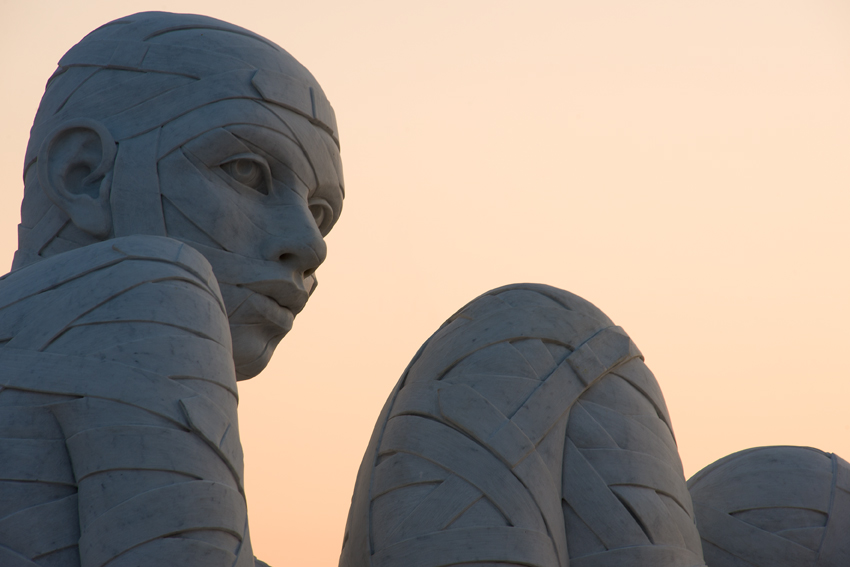
In-cinta

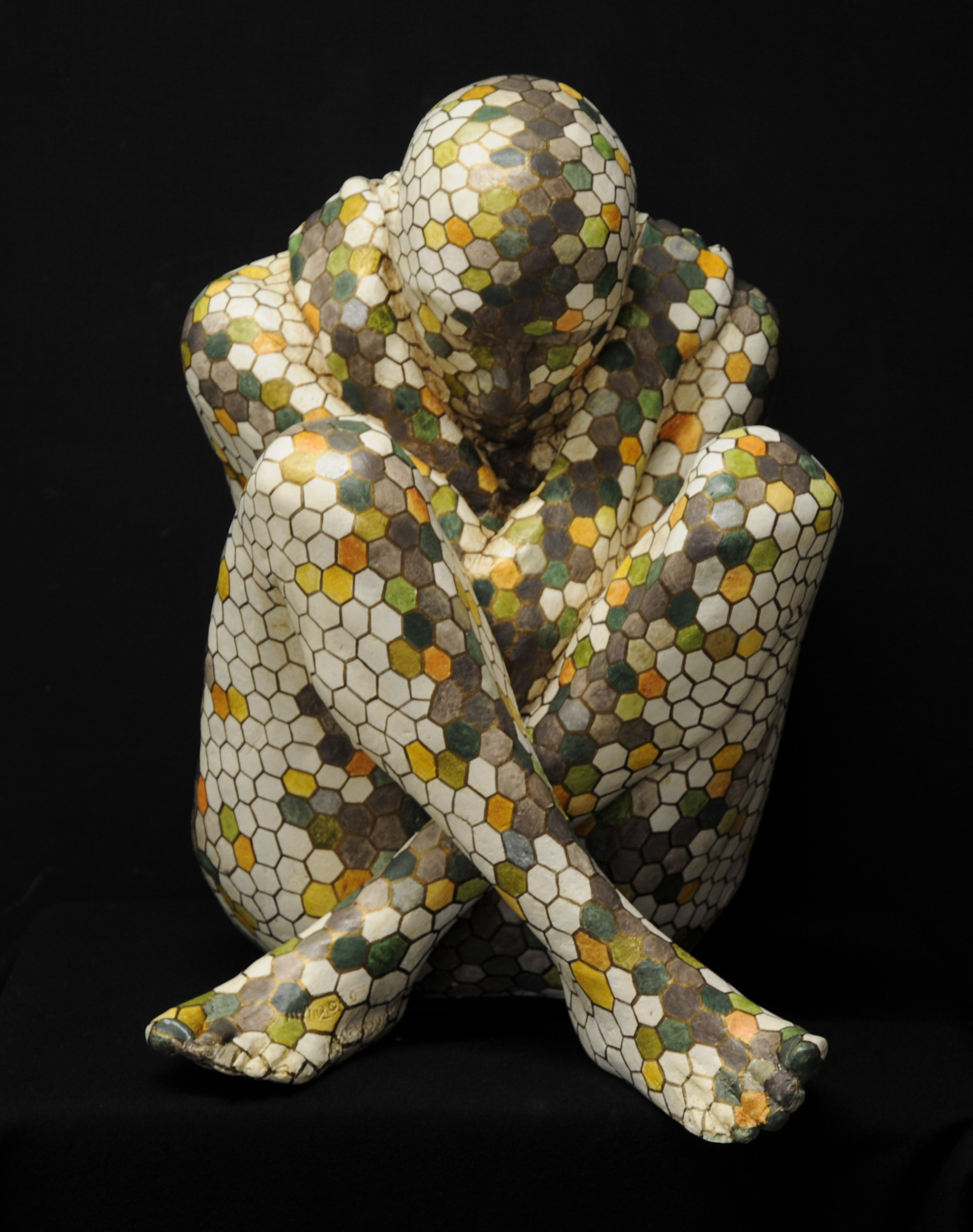
In-croci

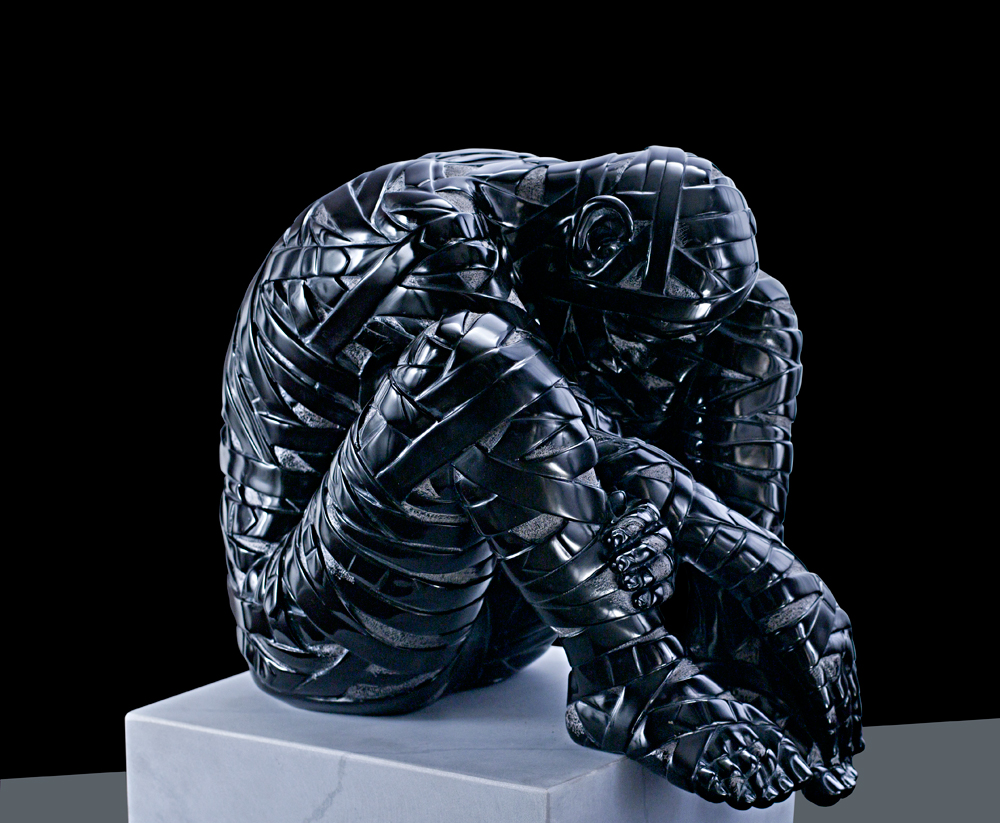
Lacerazione

== Bibliography ==
- "Rabarama" (by V. Baradel, L. M. Barbero, G. Granzotto, L. Pagnucco Salvemini; Italy. Electa, 2000)
- "Rabarama. Colori e Forme" (by G. Granzotto, L. M. Barbero; Italy, Sant’Ivo alla Sapienza, 2000)
- "Rabarama. Sculture Monumentali" (by D. Magnetti, L. M. Barbero; Italy, Palazzo Bricherasio, 2001)
- "Trans–formation" (by V. Baradel, L. M. Barbero; France, Galerie Enrico Navarra, 2001)
- "Beijing International" (by V. Sanfo; China, National Art Museum of China, 2003)
- "Sculpture Exhibition of Rabarama" (by F. Dian, X. Xiao Feng; China, He Xiangning museum, 2004)
- "Rabarama ANTICOnforme" (by L.Beatrice, George Bolge; Italy, Vecchiato ed., 2011)
