= Ah Cheng =

Chinese author and screenwriter (born 1949)

- 阿城
- Born: Zhong Acheng (锺阿城); April 5, 1949 (age 77); Beijing, China
- Occupations: author, screenwriter
- Writing career
- Language: Chinese
- Period: 1984–present
- Genres: Novel, screenplay
- Subject: Xungen movement
- Notable work: The Chess Master
- Notable awards: Nonino (1992)

Zhong Acheng (simplified Chinese: 钟阿城; traditional Chinese: 鍾阿城; pinyin: Zhōng Āchéng; born 1949), often known by his pseudonym Ah Cheng, is a Chinese author and screenwriter. He is often associated with the 1980s “root-seeking” literary movement. His best-known works are a trilogy of novellas – The Chess Master (Chinese: 棋王; pinyin: Qí Wáng; 1984), The King of Trees (Chinese: 树王; pinyin: Shù Wáng; 1985), The King of Children (Chinese: 孩子王; pinyin: Háizi Wáng; 1985) – which draw on rural life during the Cultural Revolution.

== Life and work ==
Ah Cheng's father, Zhong Dianfei, was in charge of the Chinese Communist Party's Propaganda Bureau. In 1956, as part of the Hundred Flowers campaign, he wrote an article criticizing political interference in films and was sent to the countryside. Ah Cheng had to sell his father's books to support the family, and read these Chinese and western classics before doing so. During the Cultural Revolution, Ah Cheng was also sent to the countryside, working in Shanxi, Inner Mongolia, and Yunnan, where he became a popular storyteller.

In 1976, he returned to Beijing on leave and witnessed the Tiananmen Square protests triggered by Zhou Enlai's death. His sketch of Zhou was published in the first issue of Jintian, an unofficial literary magazine founded by Bei Dao and others.

In 1979, Ah Cheng and his wife moved to Beijing. Together with He Dong, Ma Desheng, Wang Keping, Huang Rui, Li Shuang, Qu Leilei and Ai Weiwei, Ah Cheng founded the Stars Group (XingXing), an assembly of untrained, experimental artists who challenged the strict tenets of Chinese politics. As a political and artistic group, they staged exhibitions around Beijing, making way for avant-garde art in China.

Ah Cheng also began writing stories about his life in Yunnan. One of these, The Chess Master, was published in Shanghai Literature in July 1984. It was praised in Wenyi Bao, the journal of the China Writers Association, that October, and won an award in December. The King of Trees was published in Chinese Writers in January 1985, and The King of Children later that year in People's Literature. Collections of his work were published in Hong Kong and Beijing that year, and in Taipei in 1986. His narratives employ traditional Chinese folklore, Confucian and Daoist motifs, and classical storytelling techniques, marking a deliberate return to formal realism and cultural roots in contrast to earlier revolutionary literature.

Mo Yan, winner of the Nobel Prize in Literature, regarded Ah Cheng as his literary idol during his school years. Wang Shuo, a leading author of the new Beijing School, considered Ah Cheng a top-tier writer in the Beijing literary circle. Taiwanese fiction writer Chu Tʽien-wen recalled Ah Cheng’s exceptional storytelling ability and keen insights into life.

At the peak of his fame, Ah Cheng moved to the US and earned a living on manual labor and random jobs including dog-walking and wall painting. According to him, the US is no different than the places he was sent to as a child - Inner Mongolia and Yunnan. Far from China's literary circle and critics, he kept writing in the States, where he had gone to "find a desk to write at with no-one looking over my shoulder."

Chen Kaige, another contributor to Jintian, adapted The King of Children into his third film, King of the Children (1988), and Ah Cheng began working as a screenwriter.

Ah Cheng won the 1992 International Nonino Prize in Italy.

== Works ==
=== Screenplays ===
- Yue Yue (1986)
- Hibiscus Town (1986)
- Painted Skin (1992)
- Springtime in a Small Town (2002)
- The Go Master (2006)
- The Assassin (2015)

=== Novels and novellas ===
- "The Chess Master", also translated as "The King of Chess" (1984)
- "The King of Children" (Chinese: 孩子王; pinyin: Háizi wáng)) (1985)
- "The King of Trees" (simplified Chinese: 树王; traditional Chinese: 樹王; pinyin: Shù wáng)) (1985)
- Unfilled Graves (simplified Chinese: 空坟; traditional Chinese: 空墳; pinyin: Kōng fén))

=== Collections ===
- Three Kings: Three Stories from Today's China (trans. by Bonnie McDougall), published 1990 by Collins-Harvill (London).
- The King of Trees (omnibus of "King of Trees", "The King of Chess", and "The King of Children") (trans. by Bonnie McDougall), published by New Directions Publishing in 2010.
