= Huang Rui =

Chinese artist (born 1952)

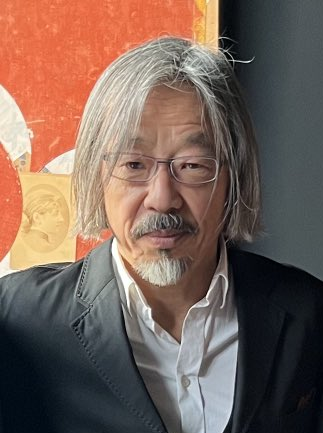
Huang Rui

Huang Rui (born 1952) is a Chinese artist known for his social and cultural criticism.

== Life and work ==
Huang Rui was born in Beijing in 1952. During the Cultural Revolution, he was sent at the age of 16 to Inner Mongolia where he worked as a farmer. He later returned to Beijing, working in a leather company until 1979. There, he studied art briefly at Beijing Worker's Cultural Center.

Huang Rui was a founding member of the Chinese avant-garde art group The Stars Art Group which included artists Wang Keping, Ai Weiwei, Mao Lizi, Ma Desheng and Li Shuang and was active in from 1979 to 1983. This groundbreaking group of amateur artists was the first publicly active art collective to protest government censorship after the Cultural Revolution. The group made headlines in 1979 when, under the direction of Huang Rui and Ma Desheng, they held an exhibition outside the China Arts Gallery (now the National Art Museum of China). On the third day of the exhibit, the police shut it down, stating that these activities "affect the normal life of the public and the social order." Before this, the majority of their exhibits were held secretly in private homes, where the artists would participate in lively debates about topics ranging from Western art trends to artistic freedom.

In 1978, Huang Rui co-published the literary journal Today (今天), which was thought to be "one of the most radical publications in circulation after the Cultural Revolution." The journal, which was in circulation for three years, included both the poetry and prose of such writers as Bei Dao, Gu Cheng, Mang Ke, Shu Ting, and Yang Lian.

Early on, Huang Rui mostly created paintings that referenced various Western artistic styles such as Expressionism, Abstract Expressionism, Fauvism and Cubism. However, as his style developed, he became more experimental and began exploring different mediums including photography, printmaking, installation art and performance art. As a result, his work is not easily classified.

Huang Rui's work is characterized by symmetry and simplicity of form, as well as by the use of primary colors. His work stands alone as aesthetically pleasing; however, he is recognized as a socially minded, and thus often controversial, artist. Throughout his career, he has continued to be vocal about his belief in the importance of free expression—and as a result, he has faced a large amount of censorship from the government.

A major theme of Huang Rui's work is the use of language. He uses texts, often Chinese political slogans, in a playful manner; however, his implications are far from comical. One of his most powerful pieces is "Charmain Mao 10,000 RMB" where he uses 10,000 RMB worth of banknotes to spell out the political slogan "Mao Zhuxi Wan Sui" which translates to "10,000 years for Chairman Mao." This work in effect links the politics of Mao with the economic efforts of Deng Xiaoping, and acknowledges the contradiction that lies in the use of Chairman Mao's image on money. While Mao used his image to push the Cultural Revolution, Deng Xiaoping used Mao's image to push his own economic revolution.

Huang Rui also often plays with the relationship between English and Chinese words, most notably in his piece "Chai-na/China" where he relates the Chinese characters "chai" and "na" (which mean "destroy here") to images from the demolition that occurred in Beijing in preparation for the Olympics. This is a theme that Huang Rui has explored in many of his works, including performance pieces. Chinese history is riddled with this idea of "Chai-na/China," as each dynasty would begin with building and creating, only to be destroyed and rebuilt by the next dynasty.

Curator and writer Berenice Angremy notes, "In Huang Rui's case, text is an environment that shapes our political outlook on a daily basis. His job is to position text to solicit reflection and provide viewers with elements of debate."

== 798 Art Zone ==
Most recently, Huang Rui has been considered the major vocal advocate of the 798 Art Zone in Beijing. He was instrumental in the establishment of the art district in 2002, and in efforts to protect the area from demolition in 2004 and 2005. In 2006, 798 became the first state recognized and protected art district in China. This success was due in a large part to Huang Rui's efforts to promote the district through the Dashanzi International Art Festivals (DIAF) and his book 798 in Beijing.

== Exhibitions ==
Huang Rui's work has been widely exhibited, both in China and abroad, over the last three decades. Recent group exhibitions include Reshaping History: 2002-2009 Chinese Contemporary Art at the China National Convention Center in Beijing, and China Avant-Garde at the Groninger Museum in the Netherlands. Recent solo exhibitions include Texts are the Legacy of Great Thought! at Chinese Contemporary in New York City, Les Rencontres d'Arles festival in France (2007), Comerchina at 10 Chancery Lane in Hong Kong, Animal Time in Chinese History at the Museo delle Mura in Rome and Huang Rui—The Stars' Time, 1977-1984 at He Xiang Ning Art Museum in Shenzhen, China. In 2021, the UCCA Center for Contemporary Art in Beijing held a solo retrospective of his abstract work, entitled "Huang Rui: Ways of Abstraction".

== Publications ==
- 1989: 365 Art Days in China and Germany, 2009
- 798 in Beijing, 2004, 2008
- The Stars' Times, 2007
- Huang Rui, 2006
