= Stars Art Exhibition =

The Star(s) Art Exhibition (Xīngxīng měizhǎn 星星美展) took place on September 27, 1979 when The Stars Art Group (Xīngxīng 星星)), a group of avant-garde and self-taught (not trained in the Academy) Chinese artists, staged an unpermitted exhibition on the railings of the China Art Gallery after being denied an official exhibition space. The artists used formerly banned western style, from Post-Impressionism to abstract expressionism to challenge both aesthetic convention and political authority. Their exhibition was closed by the police and they posted a notice on Democracy Wall. In November, the group held their first formal exhibition, Star Art Exhibition, at Beihai Park, Beijing. The exhibition included 163 works by 23 nonprofessional artists. Star Art exhibition was a milestone in China's contemporary art.
