= Ma Desheng =

Chinese artist and one of the founding members of the Stars Group

Ma Desheng, born 1952 in Beijing, is a Chinese artist and one of the founding members of the Stars Group. After being arrested for his role in arranging the group's first exhibition and repressions against "liberal thinkers", the artist relocated to Paris in 1986. Ma is self-trained as a woodblock craftsman, his works are held in various significant public and private collections including the Ashmolean Museum, and the British Museum.
