= Shi-Kuo Chang =

Taiwanese-American computer scientist and writer

- 張系國
- Born: 17 July 1944 (age 82); Chongqing, Republic of China (ROC)
- Education: National Taiwan University (BS); University of California, Berkeley (MS, PhD)
- Occupations: Writer, computer scientist
- Writing career
- Period: 1963–present
- Genre: Science fiction
- Notable work: The City Trilogy

Shi-Kuo Chang
- Traditional Chinese: 張系國
- Simplified Chinese: 张系国
Transcriptions
Standard Mandarin
- Hanyu Pinyin: Zhāng Xìgūo

Shi-Kuo Chang (Chinese: 張系國; pinyin: Zhāng Xìgūo; Wade–Giles: Chang^{1} Hsi^{4}-kuo^{1}) is a Taiwanese-American computer scientist and writer best known for his science fiction novels and short stories.

== Life and career ==
Chang was born in Chongqing in 1944 and grew up in Taiwan. After completing an undergraduate degree in electrical engineering at National Taiwan University, Chang arrived in the United States in 1966 as a graduate student. In 1967 he completed his master's degree at the University of California, Berkeley, in computer science, then earned his doctorate from Berkeley in 1969. From 1969 to 1975, Chang worked as a research scientist at the Thomas J. Watson Research Center. In 1975 he joined the Department of Information Engineering at the University of Illinois Chicago, where he was appointed Director of the Information Systems Laboratory. Since 1986 he has been a professor of computer science at the University of Pittsburgh, serving as chairman of the department from 1986 to 1991.

== Writing ==
While still an undergraduate, Chang published his first novel, Reverend Pi (皮牧師正傳, 1963). In 1975, Chang completed his first novel-length work of science fiction, Chess King (棋王). This was followed by the short story collection Nebula Suite (星雲組曲) in 1980, with the first volume of his acclaimed City Trilogy, The Five Jade Disks (五玉蝶), appearing in 1983. Defenders of the Dragon City (龍城飛將) was published three years later, in 1986, with the final volume, Tale of a Feather (一羽毛), appearing in 1991. A second short story collection, Nocturne (夜曲) was published in 1985, with further collections The Golden Gown appearing in 1994 and Glassworld in 1999.

Despite Chang's prolific output, relatively little of his science fiction is available in English translation. In 1983, "Red Boy" was included in The Unbroken Chain : An Anthology of Taiwan Fiction since 1926 (Bloomington: Indiana University Press), edited by Joseph S. M. Lau. Shortly thereafter, in 1986, Chess King was translated by Ivan Zimmerman and published in Singapore by Asiapac as a bilingual textbook for Chinese language instruction. City Trilogy, meanwhile, was translated into English by John Balcom and published by Columbia University Press in 2003.

== Activism ==
In 1978, Chang published the semi-autobiographical Anger of Yesterday (昨日之怒), drawn from his first-hand experience as a participant in the left-wing Baodiao movement during the 1970s. Composed of overseas students from the Republic of China, this movement emerged in opposition to the Okinawa Reversion Agreement, which was ratified in the U.S. Senate in 1971, ceding the administration of the disputed Senkaku Islands to Japan. When the book was republished by the Beijing-based Movable Type (北京活字文化) in 2020, Chang supplied a new forward discussing his involvement in the movement and the reception of his book in Taiwan.

== Critical writing ==
- Chang Hsi-kuo, "Realism in Taiwan fiction: two directions," in Jeannette L. Faurot. Chinese Fiction from Taiwan : Critical Perspectives. (Bloomington: Indiana University Press, Studies in Chinese Literature and Society, 1980). ISBN 0253124093.
- Joseph S.M. Lau, "Obsession with Taiwan: the fiction of Chang Hsi-Kuo", in Jeannette L. Faurot. Chinese Fiction from Taiwan : Critical Perspectives. (Bloomington: Indiana University Press, Studies in Chinese Literature and Society, 1980). ISBN 0253124093.
- Suoqiao Qian, The Mad Chinese Man in America: Zhang Xiguo's "Wife Killing", Journal of American-East Asian Relations 12 (2003): 191–206.
- Suqing Huang, "Home and Diasporic Imagination: Incorporating Immigrant Writer Chang Shi-Kuo in (Chinese) American Literary Studies", Asiatic, Vol. 9 No. 1, June 2015: 68-80.
