= Mao Lizi =

Chinese painter (born 1950)

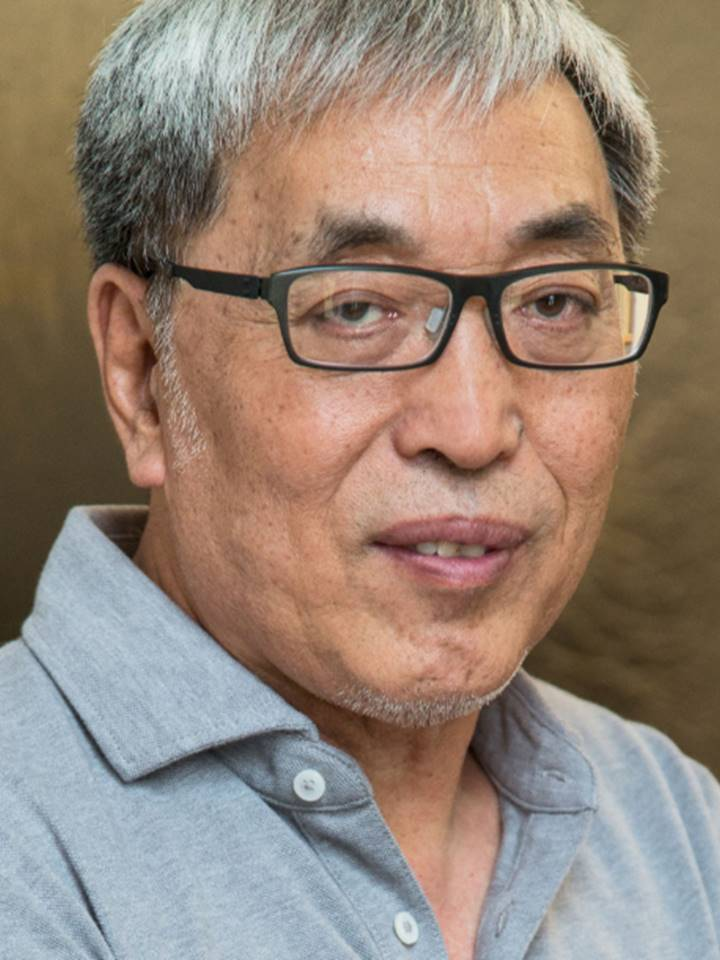
- Born: Shanghai, China
- Known for: Chinese Contemporary Art

Mao Lizi (Chinese: 毛栗子; born 1950) is the pseudonym of Zhang Zhunli (张准立), a Chinese artist born in Shanghai. He was one of the founding members of China's pioneer contemporary art groups known as the Stars, of which Ai Weiwei and Wang Keping were also members.

== Biography ==
Mao Lizi moved to Beijing with his family and began to study painting at a young age. He studied both Chinese and Western painting techniques, though he was influenced by the traditional Chinese semi-abstract landscapes. Mao Lizi initially made figurative works in the 1970s, before turning to hyperrealism in the 1980s, and in more recent years focussing purely on abstract works.

Mao Lizi is one of the founding members of the Stars, and featured in the 1979 exhibition, as well as subsequent retrospectives. The group made headlines in 1979 when they held an unauthorized exhibition at the gates of the China Arts Gallery (now the National Art Museum of China). Mao Lizi's work was featured in subsequent exhibitions on historical Chinese artists, including the Guggenheim exhibition "5000 Years Of Chinese Arts".

In 1990, Mao Lizi was guest lecturer at the Beaux-Arts de Paris school and has spent 10 years of his life in Paris. His work has since been shown in solo and group exhibitions in New York, Paris, and Hong Kong, as well as in China, including at Long museum in Shanghai, in the exhibition Experiencing Simplicity: Realistic Paintings from Long Collection.

In 2019, Mao Lizi had a solo exhibition in the recently opened space of the gallery A&R Fleury in Avenue Matignon, Paris.

Mael Bellec, the curator of the Cernuschi Museum, wrote on the occasion of this exhibition a text evoking the historical context of the artist as one of the members of the Stars: "The variety of styles employed by Mao Lizi, in a figurative vein marked by hyperrealism to the abstract compositions of more recent years is a striking testimony of the way in which the heritage of the Stars continues".

List of some important exhibitions:
Year	Title
1984	35th Anniversary of People’s Republic of China Exhibition, National Museum of China, Beijing
1985	Contemporary Oil Painting Exhibition, National Art Museum of China, Beijing
1989	The Stars 10 Years, Hong Kong
1990	Salon de Jeune Peinture, Grand Palais, Paris
1998	China: 5000 Years, Solomon R. Guggenheim Museum, New York
1998	Reckoning with the Past, Otago Museum, Dunedin
2007	Original Point, Today Art Museum, Beijing
2010	The Color of Temptation, Liechtenstein Cultural and Art Center, Liechtenstein
2010	Reconstruction – Chinese Contemporary Abstract Art, Zhejiang Art Museum, Hangzhou
2010	Spirit of the East II “Bridging”, Asia Art Center, Beijing
2011	Reality –Illusion –Mao Lizi Solo Exhibition, Asia Art Center, Beijing
2012	Infinity – Mao Lizi Tour Exhibition, National Chiang Kai-shek Memorial Hall, Taipei
2013	Culture • Mind • Becoming, Collateral Event of Chinese Art at the 55th Venice Biennale, Palazzo Mora Cannaregio, Venice
2013	Infinity – Mao Lizi Tour Exhibition, Asia Art Center, Taipei
2016	A Dream of Idleness–Mao Lizi's Oil Painting, Pékin Fine Arts, Hong Kong
2017	Mao Lizi: Solo Exhibition, Parkview Art Hong Kong, Hong Kong
2018	Beijing Abstract, Parkview Art Hong Kong, Hong Kong
2020	Out of the Blue. A Calligraphic Journey through Alcantara, Palazzo Reale, Milan
