= The Chess Master =

1984 novella by Ah Cheng

- cover of the 2005 English-Chinese bilingual edition
- Author: Ah Cheng
- Original title: 棋王 Qíwáng
- Translator: W.J.F. Jenner (2005)
- Language: Chinese
- Publication date: 1984
- Publication place: China

The Chess Master (Chinese: 棋王; pinyin: Qíwáng; lit. 'Chess King'), is a 1984 novella by Chinese writer Ah Cheng. (Note: The first English translation was bylined "A Cheng".) It features characters who are part of the Down to the Countryside Movement, which occurred during the Cultural Revolution. Written from the point of view of an unnamed narrator, it describes the titular character, Wang Yisheng, and what drives him to play Chinese chess.

In 1988, it was adapted into a film called Chess King.

== Plot ==
The story takes place in China during the Down to the Countryside Movement of the late 1960s and early 1970s. The unnamed narrator and the xiangqi player Wang Yisheng are two young intellectuals among many sent to work on farms in the mountains. During the train ride to the mountains, Wang and his friend talk about how he learned to play xiangqi and how he evolved his current strategy. Wang tells his friend that his family was very poor, and his mother disapproved of his habit. However, Wang was very devoted to xiangqi. One day, while gathering garbage to sell, Wang met an old xiangqi master. Using the principles of Daoism, the old man taught Wang everything he knew about xiangqi. Wang also tells his friend about how his mother made him a set out of discarded toothbrush handles before she died because she knew how much he loved the game. The two friends then head to different farms.

A couple of months later, Wang Yisheng visits the narrator in the mountains. One of the narrator's friends at the farm, Legballs, happens to be a good xiangqi player. Legballs is very impressed with Wang's ability, and the two become good friends.

Later, there is a local festival with a xiangqi tournament. The narrator, Legballs, and their friends all attend. Wang Yisheng arrives too late to enter the official tournament, but he challenges the winners to an unofficial match after it is over. He ends up playing nine people at once without any boards in front of him (effectively playing blind), and beats most of them easily. The final match ends in a draw, with Wang Yisheng having played against an old man who is too fragile to leave the house, and had to send his moves via messenger. Wang Yisheng bursts into tears after the match, lamenting his dead mother. The old man leaves his house to praise him personally.

== Reception ==
"The Chess Master" and Ah Cheng's other novellas were popular with many sectors of Chinese society, and well regarded by critics and scholars.

== English translations ==
The novella has been translated into English twice. One translation is a bilingual edition translated by W.J.F. Jenner and published in 2005 by The Chinese University Press; the other is by Bonnie S. McDougall and published by New Directions Publishing.

== Adaptations ==
- Chess King, a 1988 Chinese film
- King of Chess, a 1991 Hong Kong film
