= Zhang Bing (curator) =

Chinese-American curator and art writer

Zhang Bing "Zoe" 张冰
- 张冰 (pinyin: Zhāng Bīng)
- Born: Wuhan, China
- Education: Wuhan Institute of Technology
- Occupations: Art curator, writer

Zhang Bing (simplified Chinese: 张冰, pinyin: Zhāng Bīng, English nickname "Zoe") is a curator and art writer based in Los Angeles, USA. She has held significant curatorial positions at institutions such as the Goethe-Institut Shanghai and the Shanghai Duolun Museum of Modern Art. Her work focuses on awareness of social issues, heritage architecture, immigration, and emerging female Asian and Asian-American artists.

== Education ==
Zoe Bing Zhang initially studied architecture at Wuhan University of Technology.

== Early career ==
In 1998, she joined the ShanghART Gallery in Shanghai as a curator under the gallerist Lorenz Herbling. Notable exhibitions during this period included showcases of works by prominent artists such as Zhou Tiehai's ''There Came a Mr. Solomon to China'', Li Shan's ''Rouge Series'', Zeng Fanzhi's ''Mask Series'', and Zhang Enli's ''Meat Market''.

As the developing contemporary art market lacked developed, formal frameworks for art management and curation, Zhang's early work at ShanghART contributed to the creation of a practical model for the nascent field of contemporary art curation in China, as public exhibitions were as yet infrequent, underground, and marginal, with limited venues, primarily Courtyard Gallery and Red Gate Gallery in Beijing, and ShanghART in Shanghai.

== Shanghai Duolun Museum of Modern Art ==
In 2003, Zhang joined the team at the Shanghai Duolun Museum of Modern Art as the Director of Development. Duolun MOMA was the first art museum in China dedicated to contemporary art exhibitions. In this role, she was responsible for the museum's international art projects and fundraising initiatives. During her tenure, the museum presented exhibitions of numerous significant artists, including the '2006 Jean-Michel Basquiat Retrospective on Paper 1960-1988, which featured 150 works on paper, over 40 historical photographs, and a video documentary. Other notable exhibitions included Dutch Video Art featuring performance artist Marina Abramović's Art Must Be Beautiful, Artist Must Be Beautiful and a retrospective of the Spanish artist Zush, D zush A evru.

In '''2006''', Zhang undertook museum management training at New York University, where she attended courses on team leadership, curating, budget management, and museum audiences at NYU, the Guggenheim Museum, and the Museum of Modern Art (MoMA).

Subsequently, Zhang was appointed as the deputy director of the Shanghai Duolun MOMA, making her the first female director of a contemporary art museum in China. Her responsibilities encompassed the museum's annual exhibition program, international artist residencies, weekend video screening programs, experimental drama and music theaters, and the museum's bookstore.

== Curatorial experience ==
Selected exhibitions and art events curated and organized by Zoe Bing Zhang include:

- Weihai Road 696 - Shanghai Contemporary Art Ecology and Open Studios, Shanghai 2007. This project comprised a group exhibition at the Shanghai Duolun MoMA and the opening of more than 40 artist studios located at 696 Weihai Road, a historic building complex that had organically grown a local artists community. This initiative took place against a backdrop of significant loss of heritage architecture in Shanghai. The exhibition played a crucial role in preserving the historical building complex at No. 696 Weihai Road from demolition by the local government, leading to its designation as a cultural and creative industrial park and its inclusion on the city's list of protected historical buildings. By connecting art galleries and artist studios across different areas via public shuttle buses, the exhibition transformed into a city-wide art festival.
- Reincarnated Flesh/Trangressive Body, Berlin 2008. Zhang co-curated this exhibition with Thomas Grundmann, utilizing archaeology as a framework to explore the boundaries and transgressions of identity, gender, life, and death. A significant work featured was "Bathroom" by the late female artist Cui Xiuwen, which is part of the collection of the Centre Pompidou in France.
- Rebirth - When Multimedia Art Meets the People’s Electric Motor Factory, Shanghai 2009. The exhibition reflected on China's historical transformations and urban reinvention, focusing on the impact of globalization, emerging technologies, and the ecological environment. Participating artists and figures included Miao Xiaochun, Hu Jieming, Sun Xun, designer Alan Chen, and film director Ning Hao. The exhibition uniquely paired one artist with one of the nine buildings at No. 800 Changde Road, transforming the 20,000 square meter former Watson electric fan factory into a contemporary art space. After years of abandonment, this industrial heritage site underwent a transformation into a sustainable art and design creative park.
- Work with Evelyn Taocheng Wang. Zhang mentored Wang Taocheng, recommending her to the Cultural and Educational Department of the German Consulate and facilitating her residency in Göttingen, Germany. In 2010, she organized Wang Taocheng's first solo exhibition, "I Take Myself Seriously," in Beijing. Subsequently, in 2012, she curated her solo exhibition "Tide Comes Out of the Island" in Shanghai and supported her participation in the Shanghai Biennale and the Yuz Art Museum exhibition in Jakarta.
- Taipei Guandu Biennale, 2012. Co-curated with Jeab Gridthiya Gaweewong and Kim Bog-gi.
- Taipei MOT Foundation, 2013. Curated a solo exhibition for Shi Jinsong and a joint solo exhibition for Shi Zhiying and Yang Yongliang.
- Goethe Institut Open Space, 2013–2015. Zhang conceptualized the project 9m^{2} Art Museum, which involved embedding exhibition spaces within existing spaces, thereby returning spatial agency to the artists. This series of exhibitions played a significant role in shaping the academic recognition of young Chinese artists on the international art stage. Exhibiting artists included Aaajiao ("Screen Generation"), Ni Youyu and Li Qing ("Blow Up"), and Li Liao and Chen Yujun ("Mulan River").
- Lianzhou International Photography Art Festival, 2017. Zhang was a key curator for the theme exhibition My Selfie Stick, and organized solo exhibitions for artists including Amalia Ulman, for her work “Excellences and Perfections.”
- Le tombeau de la vaisselle Michel Blazy, Shanghai 2017. Curated by invitation of the French Embassy, in collaboration with Paul Freches, director of the Centre Pompidou in Shanghai.
- Performance Spectrum, Rockbund Art Museum, Shanghai 2018. This exhibition served as Zhang's response to Robert Rosenblum's Performance Art: From Futurism to the Present as well as a tribute to Chinese performance artists over the preceding two decades. The exhibition featured numerous international roundtable forums in addition to a wide variety of live performance art. This marked Zhang's final curatorial project before her relocation to the United States.
- Taipei Dangdai, Taipei 2020. At the onset of the pandemic, Zhang organized and curated a video screening program during Taipei Contemporary, featuring over 10 artists from Los Angeles, Vietnam, Thailand, Taiwan, and mainland China, including Jennifer Moon and Kenneth Tam.
- To Be or Not To Be, Song Dong; Ripples Stress, Yin Xiuzhen, Shanghai Glass Museum 2023.
- For the Love of Clay, Gallerie Lulla, Los Angeles 2024. Group exhibition of ceramic artists including Adam Alessi, David Hicks, and Jay Kvapil. This was a fundraiser with proceeds going to the Barnsdall Art Park Foundation.

== Patron of the arts ==
Prior to her immigration to the United States, Zoe Bing Zhang assisted Anxin Trust in establishing its non-profit art organization, SAAC, and was responsible for sponsoring and supporting projects within Chinese and international art museums. This included support for Rauschenberg in China at UCCA, Art and China after 1989: Theater of the World at the Guggenheim Museum, the Felix Gonzalez-Torres exhibition at the Rockbund Art Museum, lectures by directors of the Pompidou Museum and the Cartier Foundation, the Minsheng Art Museum's internal art criticism award, and sponsorships for Shanghai ART021 and the West Bund Art Fair. Currently, Zoe serves as a board member of the Barnsdall Art Park Foundation in Los Angeles and is part of the leadership circle of the Desert X Biennial.

== Philanthropy ==
Zhang is committed to social responsibility. She serves as the art consultant and initiator for the UNDP AIDS Art for Life project in China, actively participating in initiatives against discrimination. From 2004 to 2011, she led three visits by artists to AIDS villages in China and collaborated with numerous renowned artists, film directors, and musicians to organize art exhibitions, charity auctions, and donations, including Xu Bing, Zhang Xiaogang, Xiang Jing, Zuoxiao Zuzhou, and Gu Changwei. In 2013, she was awarded the International Visitor Leadership Program (IVLP) Scholarship by the US State Department.
