= 50 Moganshan Road =

Shanghai's contemporary art district

M50 Creative Park
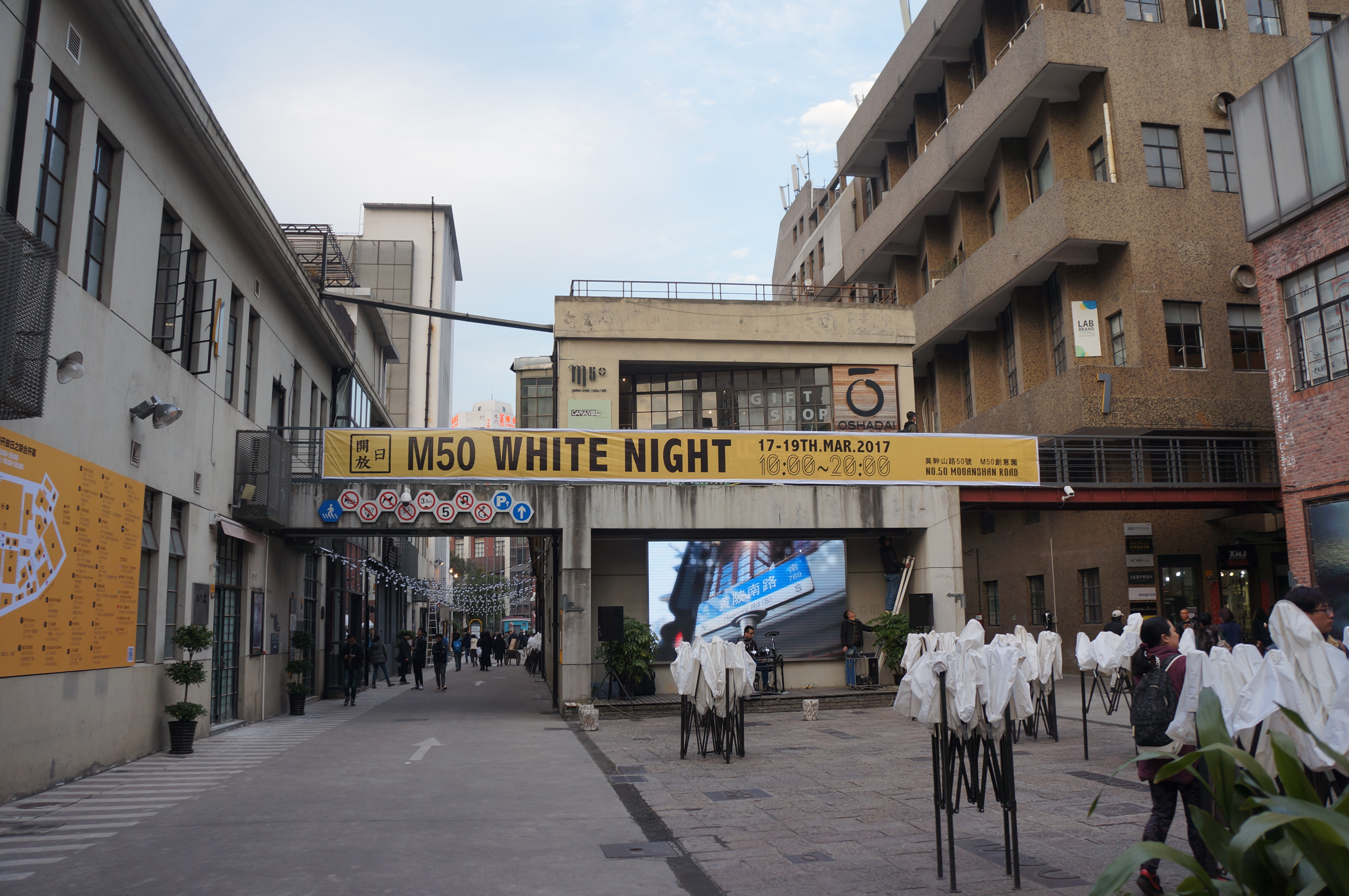
- Interior of M50
- Established: 2000
- Location: Shanghai; China
- Coordinates: 31.1451°N 121.2655°E
- Type: Contemporary art
- Public transit access: Jiangning Road 13 Zhongtan Road 3 4
- Website: m50

50 Moganshan Road (Chinese: 莫干山路50号) or "M50" is a contemporary art district in Shanghai, China, that houses a community of more than a hundred artists whose studios are open to the public. It is often compared with New York's SoHo and Beijing's 798 Art Zone. The art quarter has become a popular cultural attraction for local and international visitors alike, and was named among the top ten things to do in Shanghai by Time.

== Location ==
The name refers to its actual address in Shanghai, and is often shortened to M50 or Moganshan Road. It is tucked away in an old industrial area along the Suzhou Creek. The art quarter is located in industrial and residential Putuo District, but conveniently close to downtown Jing'an District.

== History ==
50 Moganshan Road was once the Chunming Slub Mill. The art scene was started in 2000 by local artist Xue Song who was initially attracted by the cheap rent of the disused industrial space. Other artists including Ding Yi, Qu Fengguo, and Wang Xingwei, soon followed. Today the quarter's former factories and warehouses have been converted into art galleries, artists' studios, design agencies and other visual art and cultural businesses of various sizes. The land and buildings are still owned by Shangtex, the state-owned textile group that operated the now defunct factory.

== Artists and galleries ==
M50 hosts over 120 galleries and art studios. Some of Shanghai's best known artists work here, including Zhou Tiehai, Ding Yi, Yelan, and the media art collective Liu Dao. Galleries include ShanghART Gallery, EastLink Gallery, island6, Pantocrator Gallery, and Biz Art.

== Transportation ==
The closest Shanghai Metro station in the vicinity of M50 is Jiangning Road Station (on Line 13), followed by Zhongtan Road Station (on Line 3 and Line 4).

== Gallery ==
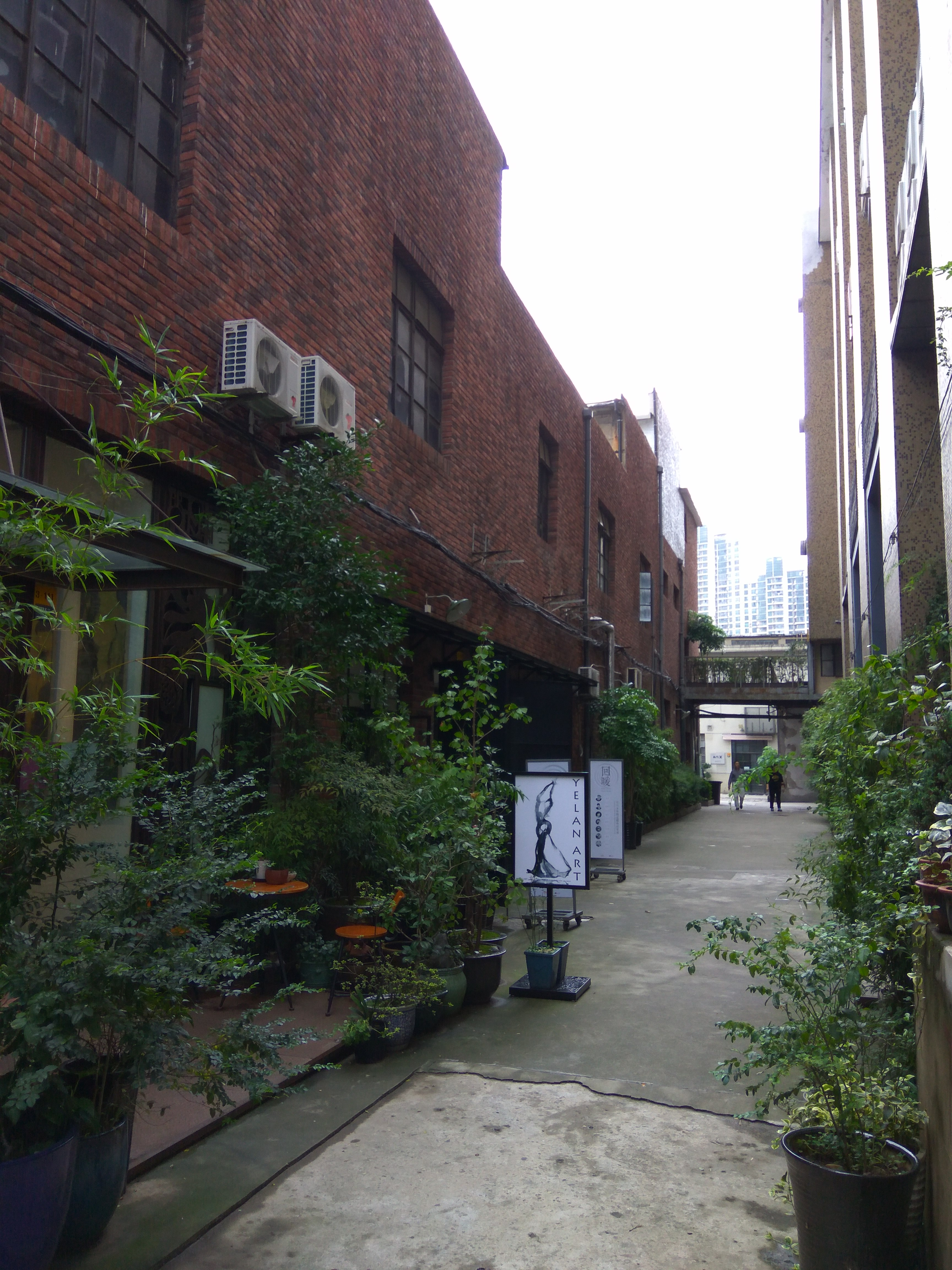
Outside Building 3, M50

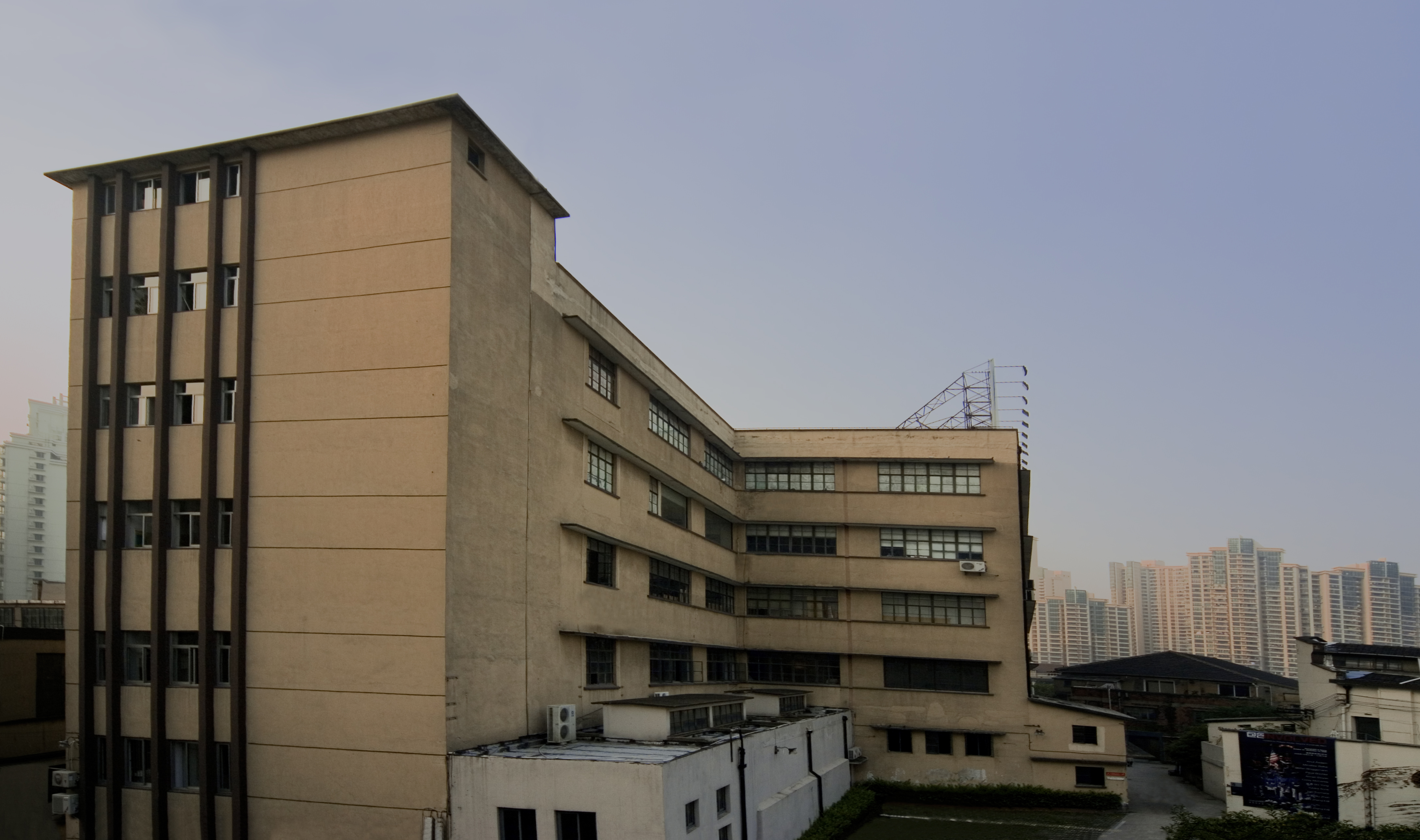
Island6 arts centre in the M50 art district.

== See also ==
- Museum of Contemporary Art Shanghai
- Shanghai Museum
- Yuz Museum Shanghai
- Power Station of Art
- Rockbund Art Museum
- The Bund Finance Center
- Long Museum
- China Art Museum
- Tianzifang
- West Bund Art & Design
- 798 Art Zone
