= ShanghART Gallery =

Contemporary art galleries in Asia

- Established: 1996
- Founder: Lorenz Helbling
- Type: Art gallery
- Location: Shanghai, Beijing, Singapore
- Website: shanghartgallery.com

ShanghART Gallery is founded in 1996 by Swiss gallerist Lorenz Helbling as one of the first contemporary art galleries established in China. Initially operating out of a hotel, it has since expanded to four gallery spaces, two in Shanghai, and one each in Beijing and Singapore. For the past two decades, ShanghART has devoted to the development of contemporary art in China and kept close and long-term cooperation with more than 60 artists, building an audience for artists ranging from painters such as Yu Youhan and abstractionist Ding Yi (the artist of the gallery's first exhibition), to artists midway through their career, Zhou Tiehai and Yang Fudong, as well as emerging artists like Zhang Ding and Chen Wei. The Singapore space in Gillman Barracks, established in 2013, extended their outreach to Southeast Asian artists such as Robert Zhao Renhui and Apichatpong Weerasethakul.

== History ==
ShanghART's first exhibition opened in 1996 on a few walls, with just a chair and a table, along with a phone extension in Portman Shangri-La (now Portman Ritz-Carlton). Starting with Ding Yi, the gallery held exhibitions for artists such as Zeng Fanzhi, Xue Song, and Wu Yiming among others in its time at Portman Shangri-La.

The subsequent sale of Portman to Ritz-Carlton forced ShanghART to move on, and the gallery found its own space in 1999, first in a small space in Fuxing Park before moving to a large warehouse in the Suzhou Creek area in 2000. The same year, ShanghART became the first gallery from China to participate in Art Basel, one of the biggest and most prestigious art fairs in the world. This marks the beginning of an increased presence in international art fairs such as FIAC, Frieze, and the Armory Show in years to come. At the same time, many of ShanghART's artists start to gain international recognition, participating in shows in museums and galleries globally as well as international art festivals and biennales, cementing ShanghART's position as one of the leading galleries in China.

=== Moving into M50 and Further Expansions ===
In the early 2000s, ShanghART Gallery started to move into the emerging art district at 50 Moganshan Road where many of their artists have rented studios at. The gallery finally moved into its newly renovated permanent space in 2006, after renting a separate warehouse, H-Space, in 2004 to exhibit large-scale works. A few years later, the gallery opened another space, this time at Beijing, in another quickly developing art district Caochangdi.

ShanghART Gallery stepped out of China for the first time in 2012, taking a space in the newly opened Gillman Barracks arts cluster in Singapore, opening with an exhibition of Geng Jianyi. This establishes an overseas presence for the gallery and it is one of the few original galleries still remaining at the area as of 2020.

=== Development of West Bund and continued growth ===
Celebrating its 20th anniversary in 2016, ShanghART Gallery moved into a new space in the West Bund, an area that is along Huangpu River, east of Xuhui District. West Bund was designed to support city living and built with the idea of being an iconic district in the city in mind. Various cultural and arts institutions have since taken root in the district, including ShanghART Gallery in its three-storey building. Aside from two floors of exhibition space, the new building consists of a publicly accessible library that hosts an impressive collection of art books from its artists, multi-functional rooms, as well as a rooftop terrace. The gallery closed its original space at Moganshan Road which later reopened in 2017 as ShanghART M50.

In September 2022, the Singapore space celebrated its 10th anniversary alongside the tenth year of Gillman Barracks' establishment with an exhibition that references its very first presentation of Zhang Enli in 2012, alongside Southeast Asian artists Melati Suryodarmo, Apichatpong Weerasethakul, and Robert Zhao Renhui.

== Artists ==
Artists represented by the gallery include:

- Chen Wei
- David Diao
- Ding Yi
- Lynn Hershman Leeson
- Liang Shaoji
- Shen Fan
- Sun Xun
- Melati Suryodarmo
- Tang Da Wu
- Wang Guangyi
- Apichatpong Weerasethakul
- Wei Guangqing
- Xu Zhen
- Yang Fudong
- Zeng Fanzhi
- Zhang Ding
- Zhang Enli
- Robert Zhao Renhui
- Zhou Tiehai
