= Jinqing Caroline Cai =

Jinqing Cai
- Born: Beijing, China
- Other name: Caroline
- Education: Beijing University, Wellesley College, Princeton University
- Known for: President of Kering Greater China

Chinese name
- Chinese: 蔡金青
- Hanyu Pinyin: Cài Jīnqīng

Jinqing Cai is the President of Kering Greater China. Before that, she was President of Christie's China. She held Christie's first auction in China where Christie's earned US$25 million. Before she was appointed as the senior vice president and managing director of Christie's China, she worked for the Brunswick Group, the New Alliance Consulting International, and the k1 Ventures.

== Early life and education ==
Born and raised in Beijing, China, Cai studied at Beijing University before she pursued overseas education. She studied Chemistry at Beijing University from 1986 to 1989, and transferred to Wellesley College on 1989. She received bachelor's degrees in Arts, Chemistry, and Economics. Then, she continued her education at Princeton University from 1991 to 1993 and received master's degrees in Public Affairs, Economics, and Public Policy.

== Early career ==
In 1997, Cai moved to Hong Kong and worked at a venture capital firm investing in media, entertainment and online business. She then returned to her hometown Beijing in 2002 and started her own public relations company called New Alliance. New Alliance worked closely on public relations among government, corporate and media organizations. Cai, along with New Alliance, managed the first annual Davos-like Boao Forum for Asia. In 2005, Cai joined Brunswick, a global public relations firm as a partner and specialized in financial communications and executive strategies. Some cases she worked on are CNOOC's Unocal buyout attempt and Geely's complete acquisition of Volvo.

== Time at Christie's ==
Cai began her position as the first Managing Director of the China branch of Christie's on June 1, 2012. She leads the branch from the Shanghai location, serving as a consultant on Chinese and global art markets and overseeing all events put on by Christie's China. Cai was in charge of the company's first auction in mainland China which, combined with three days of exhibitions, lectures, and private sales, earned RMB 154 million (US$25 million). According to Cai before the September 26, 2013 auction, the goal of Christie's China is to "allow Chinese buyers direct access to our global network and expertise… the Shanghai auction company will open new channels for us to source and promote Chinese art directly." On October 22, 2014, under Cai's guidance, Christie's opened a new building for galleries and offices close to the tourist district known as The Bund. In its first year since the opening auction, Christie's office in Shanghai has sold contemporary Chinese art, modern art, and fine wine and jewellery. During the series of sales celebrating the one year anniversary of its first auction, the most expensive artwork Christie's China sold was Zeng Fanzhi's Untitled 06-3, which earned RMB 19.5 million (US$3.2 million). According to Cai, the three auctions reached RMB 132 million (US$21 million) in total and sold about 150 pieces.

In January 2015, Cai was named to Foreign Policy magazine's Pacific Power Index, a list of "50 people shaping the future of the U.S.-China relationship."

In 2018, she was appointed President of Kering Greater China.
