= West Bund Art & Design =

Annual international contemporary art fair in Shanghai, China

- Established: 2014
- Location: Shanghai
- Type: Contemporary art
- Public transit access: Yunjin Road 11
- Website: www.westbundshanghai.com

The West Bund Art & Design Fair (Chinese: 西岸艺术与设计博览会) is an annual contemporary art fair held every November in Shanghai, China, on the western side of the Huangpu River in Shanghai's Xuhui District.

== History ==
Founded in 2014, West Bund Art & Design is the largest art exhibition in Shanghai, held from 8-11 November. Since the founding of West Bund Art & Design, other galleries and institutions have established themselves in the West Bund district, such as the Long Museum and ShanghART Gallery.

Since 2016, the fair has collaborated with ArtReview to curate 'Xiàn Chǎng', a series of solo artist projects both within the fair and around the local area.

== See also ==
- Long Museum
- 50 Moganshan Road
- Power Station of Art
- China Art Museum
- Museum of Contemporary Art Shanghai
- Shanghai Museum
- 798 Art Zone
