= Wei Guangqing =

Chinese painter

Wei Guangqing (simplified Chinese: 魏光庆; traditional Chinese: 韋光清) (born 1963 in Huangshi City, Hubei Province) is a contemporary Chinese painter. He is known most of all for his Red Wall and Made in China Series. Wei Guangqing was one of the main members of the “85’s New Wave Art Movement”. In the 1990s he became one of the most well-known "political Pop artists". His work adopts a flat and symbolic composition, linking traditional ethics and modern culture. “Red Wall” is a symbolic work of pop art, using the traditional woodcarving-illustration prints and stories, through the process of Pop, to imply the various meanings of contemporary private and secular life. Wei Guangqing includes the contradictions of tradition and modernity by using a language related to cartoons and comic strips. His color palette consists of strong, often complementary colors. The artist creates a historical-ethical Pop with regional significance and uses the age-old tradition as a metaphor about today’s world.

== Selected solo exhibitions ==
- 2008 “Old Scriptures”, ShanghART H-Space, Shanghai, China
- 2007 “Zuo Tu You Shi”, He Xiangning Art Museum, Shenzhen, China
- 2005 “Made in China – the painting of Wei Guangqing”, Hubei Institute of Fine Arts, Wuhan, China
- 2004 “Chinese Classics: three word-rhymes”, ShanghART Gallery, Shanghai, China
- 2002 “Twenty-six evil spirit passes – the day of peace”, ShanghART Gallery, Shanghai, China
- 2000 “The extended virtuous words – red wall series”, ShanghART Gallery, Shanghai, China
- 1998 “A simulation experience on the suicide scheme about ‘1’ performance art”, Wuchang East Gate, Wuhan, China

== Selected group exhibitions ==
- 2008
  - “Hubei!”, Edward Pranger Oriental Art Gallery, Amsterdam, the Netherlands
- 2007
  - “Aired”, ShanghART Gallery, Shanghai, China
  - “85&89-85 ART Mind and Post 89 Art”, Expol-Sources Art Space, Beijing, China
  - “85 New Wave - The Birth of Chinese Contemporary Art”, Ullens Center for Contemporary Art, Beijing, China
  - “Forms of Concepts: The Reform of Concepts of Chinese Contemporary Art 1987-2007－The New Generation and Bad Art”, 2007 Wuhan 2nd Documentary Exhibition of Fine Arts, Wuhan, China
  - “Individual Positions 1”, ShanghART Gallery, Shanghai, China
  - “Contemporary Cultural Venation-China Version-2007”, Credit Beijing Contemporary Art Exhibition, Today Art Gallery, Beijing, China
  - “Wuhan! Wuhan!” Wuhan Contemporary Art Exhibition 2007, Nanjing, China
  - “Resonance 2007” Chinese Contemporary Oil Painting Exhibition, Shenzhen Museum of Contemporary Art, Shijiazhuang, China
  - “What's Next?” Chinese Contemporary Art Exhibition, Hong Kong City Hall
  - “Chinese Contemporary Soart”, The State Tretyakov Gallery, Moscow
- 2006
  - “Limitation and Freedom – Spring Market”, Fine Arts Literature Art Center, Wuhan, China
  - “New China”, Pablo’s Birthday Gallery, New York, U.S.A
  - “Mahjong: Contemporary Chinese Art from the Sigg Collection” (travelling exhibition) Hamburger Kunsthalle, Hamburg, Germany
  - Kunstmuseum Bern, Bern, Switzerland
  - The 1st Annual Exhibition of Contemporary Chinese Art, Century Forum Art Museum, Beijing, China
- 2005
  - “Conspire”, Beijing TS1 Contemporary Art Center 1st Exhibition, Beijing, China
  - “China - Contemporary Painting”, Fondazione Carisbo, Bologna, Italy
- 2004
  - “The 1st Wu Han Nominative Exhibition of Fine Arts Literature”, Art Gallery of Hubei Institute of Fine Arts, China
  - “Beyond Boundaries”, Shanghai Gallery of Art, Shanghai, China
- 2003
  - The 3rd Chinese Oil Painting Exhibition, China National Museum of Fine Arts, Beijing, China
- 2002
  - “Reinterpretation: A Decade of Experimental Chinese Art”, The First Guangzhou Trienniale, Guangdong Museum of Art, Guangzhou, China
  - “Chinart - Chinese Contemporary Art”, Museum Küppersmühle Sammlung Grothe, Germany
  - The 17th Asian International Art Exhibition, Daejeon Museum of Art, Daejeon, Korea
  - “A Point in Time”, Meilun Art Museum, Changsha, China
  - “Conceptual Images - 2002 Chinese Contemporary Oil Painting Exhibition”, Shenzhen Art Museum, Guangdong, China
  - “Paris-Pekin”, Espace Pierre Cardin, Paris, France
- 2001
  - The 16th Asian International Art Exhibition, Guangdong Museum of Art, China
  - “Hotpot”, Hustnernes Hus, Oslo, Norway
  - “As long as they catch mice...”, Munkeruphus Gallery, Mumkerphus, Denmark
- 2000
  - “Global Conceptualism - Points of Origin, 1950s-1980s”, MIT List Visual Arts Center, Cambridge, USA
  - “Global Conceptualism”, Miami Art Museum, U.S.A
  - “Chinese Contemporary Painting Exhibition”, Breda's Museum, Breda, The Netherlands
  - “Society - The 2nd Academic Exhibition”, Chendu Upriver Gallery, Sichuan, China
- 1999
  - “Fortune Global Forum Contemporary Art Exhibit”, Jinmao Podium Bldg. Shanghai
  - “Global Conceptualism: Points of Origin, 1950s-1980s”, Queens Museum of Art, New York, USA
  - The 14th International Asian Art Exhibition, Asian Art Museum, Fukuoka, Japan
- 1998
  - “Chinese Contemporary Art Exhibition”, Haus der Kulturen der Welt, Berlin, Germany
  - “China!” (travelling exhibition)
  - Haus der Kulturen der Welt, Berlin, Germany
  - Artist's House, Vienna, Austria
  - Charlottenburg Exhibition Centre, Copenhagen, Denmark
  - Zacheta Modern Art Mudrum, Warsaw, Poland
- 1997
  - “Talk to China”, Copenhagen, Denmark
  - Red & Grey - 8 Chinese Artists”, Soobin, Singapore
  - “Quotation Marks - Chinese Contemporary Paintings”, National Art Museum, Singapore
- 1996
  - “Reality: Present& Future - '96 Chinese Contemporary Art”, International Art Palace, Beijing, China
- 1995
  - “New Asian Art Show: China, Korea, Japan” (travelling exhibition),
  - Tokyo & Fukuoka, Japan
  - Gallery of Capital Normal University, Beijing
  - Beyond Ideology: New Art from China”, Haus der Kulturen der Welt, Hamburg, Germany
- 1994
  - The 2nd Chinese Oil Painting Exhibition, Shanghai Art Museum; National Art Museum of China, Beijing
- 1993
  - ‘93 Chinese Oil Painting Biennale Exhibition, Beijing
  - “China's New Art, Post-1989”, Hong Kong Arts Centre and City Hall, Hong Kong
- 1992
  - The First Guangzhou Art Biennial in China, Guangzhou International Conference And Exhibition Centre
  - The First Bienniale Art Exhibition, Guangzhou
- 1991
  - The First Chinese Oil Painting Exhibition, Beijing
- 1990
  - “I Don't Want to Play Cards with Cezanne”, Pacific Asia Museum, Pasadena, California, USA
- 1989
  - “China/Avant-garde Art Exhibition”, National Art Museum of China, Beijing
