= Robert Zhao Renhui =

Singaporean artist

Robert Zhao Renhui (born 1983 in Singapore) is a contemporary visual artist who works mainly in photography but often adopts a multi-disciplinary approach, presenting images together with archival documents and objects in the form of textual and media analysis, video and photography projects. His artistic practice investigates human's complex relationship with nature, layering historical narratives with fiction and fantasy, to invoke doubts in his audience towards the concept of truth and its portrayal. In 2008, he founded the Institute of Critical Zoologists (ICZ), under which he operated for a number years. Together with Haeju Kim, Senior Curator at Singapore Art Museum, Zhao represented Singapore at the 60th International Art Exhibition – La Biennale di Venezia in 2024.

== Education and personal life ==
Growing up, Zhao picked up photography with his father's film camera, taking photographs in school and creating ghost photographs by drawing on the negative before printing them. He realised the potential of photography as a medium for storytelling when his classmates believed the apparitions were real. He also attributes his interest in nature to his father, who only watched National Geographic and Discovery Channel programmes and kept bonsai plants and fish at home.

Zhao studied at Temasek Polytechnic in Singapore, before pursuing photography in the United Kingdom. He obtained a bachelor of arts from the Camberwell College of Arts in 2008, University of the Arts, and graduated cum laude with a master of arts from the London College of Communication, United Kingdom in 2011.

== Career ==
Zhao founded ICZ in 2008, in his final year at Camberwell. A fictional scientific research organisation that exists as a website, it "aims to develop a critical approach to the zoological gaze, or how humans view animals." Following its creation, Zhao operated under its name, creating projects presented in a pseudo-scientific format, using scientific language and its modes of classification. In doing so, he questions the objectivity of and our trust in scientific journalism. He also challenges historical narratives, conventional modes of knowledge production and the way we consume and perceive information by blurring and merging reality with fiction to evoke new perspectives on human's relationship with nature. In 2009, Zhao founded another fictitious organisation, The Land Archive (TLA), that is "dedicated to the spread of knowledge about how a nation's lands are utilised and perceived." Similarly to ICZ, TLA questions historical narratives by layering them with fiction and fantasy to create or facilitate new, alternative ones. As We Walk on Water (2010–12) is one such project developed under TLA, as an investigation into land reclamation in Singapore and its implications. Zhao's investigation into the impact of human action and intervention on the natural environment are further informed by research conducted and residencies undertaken around the world. Examples of such projects include The Whiteness of a Whale (2010) on the whaling culture in Japan, from his residency at Fukuoka Asian Art Museum; The Glacier Study Group (2011) on the melting of glaciers and its impact on the surrounding Arctic flora and fauna, from his residency at The Arctic Circle, Norway; and Flies Prefer Yellow (2014) on insects and insect traps from his residency at Kadist, San Francisco, where he visited the insect lab at the California Department of Food and Agriculture and tracked, observed, collected and catalogued insects encountered during his time in California. Stemming from his interest in collecting all things bizarre, objects found during his travels as well as animal memorabilia and souvenirs purchased online or in gift shops eventually developed into museum projects such as The ICZ Collection that highlight overlooked species, or found their way into his "cabinet of curiosities" installations, such as The Bizarre Honour (2017), a natural history museum housing over 300 natural and scientific artifacts. This museological approach continues in The Nature Museum (2017), with iterations in Shanghai at Rockbund Art Museum; and Athens at Onassis Stegi in 2018. Around this time, Zhao began his exploration of secondary forests, conducting extensive fieldwork in the forest around Gillman Barracks as part of his residency programme at NTU Centre for Contemporary Art Singapore. Queen's Own Hill and its Environs (2019), its title taken from the Barracks' former name, arose from this exploration. Building on four years of research, The Forest Institute (2022) is an architectural art installation erected in the Barracks. It draws on overlooked narratives, such as the Albizia tree, and offers an intimate (re)discovery of the forest. First introduced to Singapore in the 1870s, the Albizia tree is the subject of Zhao's eponymous work: Albizia (2023). An immersive performance installation of a secondary forest, it comprises videos, photography, sound and found objects collected from the forest. Marking the first time his work is presented in a theatre studio and in such a experiential and performative manner, this installation invites audiences to "consider the potential for life and regeneration in these forests on the margins of our island." In 2024, Zhao presented his decade-long work on secondary forests in Singapore in an extensive installation titled Seeing Forest for the Singapore Pavilion, curated by Haeju Kim, at the 60th International Art Exhibition – La Biennale di Venezia. The presentation was accompanied by a complimentary publication co-published by SAM and K. Verlag Berlin. In the following year, Seeing Forest opened to local audience at SAM during Singapore Art Week 2025 and ran for four months.

== Artworks ==
A Guide to the Flora and Fauna of the World (2013) A Guide to the Flora and Fauna of the World is a project commissioned by Singapore Biennale 2013: If The World Changed. Responding to this title, the installation seeks to document and reflect upon the impact of human intervention on the natural world, whether by deliberate, direct means, such as square apples in South Korea, or by evolving to adapt to the stresses from their changing environment. Its accompanying publication, designed in collaboration with graphic designer Hanson Ho of H55, is presented as an encyclopaedic dossier in an archival box. Its design won The President's Design Award's Designer of the Year 2014.

A Guide to the Flora and Fauna of the World has been exhibited around the world including at the Centre of Contemporary Photography, Australia; Les Rencontres d'Arles, France; and Biel/Bienne Festival of Photography, Switzerland, in 2015; Chobi Mela IX, India, in 2017; Sunderland Museum and Winter Garden, United Kingdom; and FotoFest, United States, in 2019; Center for Book Arts, United States, in 2021; and 9th Bi-City Biennale of Urbanism\Architecture, China, in 2022. The set of 64 photographs from this project has been acquired by Tate Modern, United Kingdom.

Trying to Remember a Tree (2016)

What started as an effort to memoralise the end of life of a young raintree in 2015 turned into an ongoing documentation of trees removal in Singapore, a series that continues till today. Then, when the tree was cut down to make way for construction, Zhao dragged the branches back to his studio, subsequently spending a year photographing every leaf there was. The resulting diptych portraying all 28,017 leaves was exhibited at the Rockbund Art Museum in 2018.

- Trying to Remember a Tree III, The World Will Surely Collapse (2017)

Commissioned by and first presented at JIWA: Jakarta Biennale 2017, this work features an old and large tree that had collapsed near Zhao's home after a storm. Fourteen photographs line up sections of the tree's trunk on the ground, echoing the way trees are cut for easy removal in Singapore. Yet edited and sequenced from their original, they highlight the contrasting ways in which fallen trees are treated: promptly removed by humans or, allowed to remain as part of the ecosystem in nature.

- Trying to Remember a Tree IV, The Time Tree (2019)

Commissioned by the National Arts Council's Public Art Trust in commemoration of the Singapore Bicentennial in 2019, the public art installation hypothesises what a 200-year-old tree – responding to the bicentennial anniversary of the founding of modern Singapore – might look like. Referencing Singapore's tallest recorded tree, The Changi Tree (also nicknamed as The Time Tree) which was documented from 1888 and felled by the British in 1942 to prevent the Japanese from using it as a ranging point during World War II, the work takes the lifecycle of trees – its life, death and renewal – as a marker for time and a new way of reflecting on historical narratives.

- Trying to Remember a Tree V, It Takes Time (2021)

Another commission by the Public Art Trust, this is a site-specific artwork that follows the growth of a single tree, selected by Zhao from the site where the work was to be situated, for twelve months. The installation comprises twelve light boxes, each one added to the site every month as the tree grew over the same period. The title of the work is displayed as text on the back the light boxes, inviting its audience to connect deeper with nature with small, subtle changes that often go unnoticed.

- Trying to Remember a Tree VI, Watching a Tree Disappear (2018–ongoing)

This is a live video feed from a camera installed by Zhao to document the decay and eventual disappearance of an Albizia tree that fell after a storm in 2018. Whenever motion is detected by the camera, it records and sends this recording to a live streaming website. This project continues until the tree decays and disappears into the ground.

Christmas Island, Naturally (2016) This work is based on over two years of research and fieldwork on Christmas Island, an external territory of Australia located in the Indian Ocean. As "an experiment in natural history investigation" into the evolution of Christmas Island's ecosystem, the work traces and reflects upon the devastating impact of nearly 150 years of human settlement on the island's unique biodiversity and endemic flora and fauna, such as the introduction of invasive species into and extinction of native ones within its fragile ecosystem. This work was commissioned by and presented at the Sydney Biennale (2016) and subsequently as solo exhibitions at ShanghART Singapore and ShanghART M50, Shanghai, in 2017. In the following year, it was shown at NTU Centre for Contemporary Art Singapore.

The Bizarre Honour (2017) Presented as a natural history museum within a terrace house in Singapore, this installation surveys over a century of contentious relationship between Singapore and animals, insects and pests. Reflecting personal collecting habits and interests and utilising almost four years of research, over 300 natural and scientific "curiosities", ranging from colonial photos, taxidermy and animal traps to tropical field equipment, are exhibited, accompanied by a dossier comprising memos, photographs and information relating to the exhibition.

The Lines We Draw (2019) This work depicts murmurations of more than 50,000 migratory birds when they fly up into the sky from the shoreline of Yalu River every morning during the annual migratory season. Located between China and North Korea, the river serves not only as a political border between the two countries, but also as a checkpoint for the birds when they travel to Alaska from New Zealand. Created during the artist's visit to Yalu River in 2019, the work seeks to investigate the systems humans set up to understand other species.

A Great Sign Appeared (2021) This work looks at the threats of urbanisation and the transnational impact of climate change on avian colonies in Southeast Asia, such as the sudden appearances of Asian openbill storks in 2019 and that of flying foxes in 2020 in Singapore. The former was attributed to the unseasonal drought in Thailand and the latter, possibly to the destruction of their natural habitat or sustained hunting. Such ecological connections, as well as more mundane encounters with non-human species, became more apparent to Zhao during the COVID-19 pandemic. This work won Zhao the Silvana S. Foundation Commission Award (Singapore) in 2020.

The Forest Institute (2022) Building on Zhao's earlier work Queen's Own Hill and its Environs (2019) and four years of research on the secondary forest around the Gillman Barracks precinct, The Forest Institute is a large-scale architectural art installation built on public space within the Barracks. It focuses on Berlayer Creek, a tributary that courses through the forest, and one of two remaining mangrove swamps in the south of Singapore that is also a refuge for numerous species of migratory birds and other animals. Its architectural design, by architect Randy Chan, draws reference from the Bornean longhouse. The installation includes several large-scale prints of fauna and a Forest Observation Room, which can house up to two adults and two children overnight for a fee.

Seeing Forest (2024) Conceived for the Singapore Pavilion at the 60th International Art Exhibition ‒ La Biennale di Venezia (2024), Seeing Forest reveals the adaptive responses of nature when it inhabits previously deforested land, thereby highlighting the complex relationships between nature and human life (and/or intervention). It comprises a two-channel video The Owl, The Travellers and The Cement Drain, in which two travellers takes us through the secondary forests in Singapore and the life forms that lie within; an installation Trash Stratum, a crumbling cabinet of stacked wooden boxes with 15 screens, archival photographs and found shards from the forests; Buffy, a towering structure with an image of the Buffy Fish Owl; and A Guide to a Secondary Forest of Singapore, that maps out the forest ecosystems within which both natural and man-made elements co-exist. Everything the Forest Remembers (2024)

This series of images documents the ongoing transformation of small glass shards in the Gillman Barracks forest as they interact with natural processes of erosion and growth. Once remnants of human activity, the discarded materials now exist as part of the forest ecosystem, slowly blending into the environment shaped by rain, roots, and time. The Centre of All Things (2024)

Extracted from a motion-sensitive instant camera positioned near the stump of a fallen Albizia tree, this series of images documents the dead tree's ongoing interactions with its environment and its contributions to the ecosystem as it decomposes. The ICZ publishes newspapers routinely from the perspective of the tree, providing insight into the quiet, persistent changes within this landscape.

Every Tree is its Own Universe (2024) This series of images centres around the Albizia tree, a species native to the Maluku Islands in Indonesia and introduced to Singapore intentionally in the 19th century. Photographed in its place of origin and four different parts of Singapore—Tampines, Punggol, Jurong and Woodlands, the work highlights the significant role of the Albizia in rewilding disturbed spaces.

== Awards, exhibitions and residencies ==
Zhao's works have been awarded The United Overseas Bank Painting of the Year Award (Singapore) in 2009, the Sony World Photography award at Cannes in 2010, and The Deutsche Bank Award in Photography in 2011. He was awarded the Young Artist Award by the National Arts Council, Singapore, the nation's highest award for young arts practitioners aged 35 and below, in 2010. In 2017, he was the only Southeast Asian artist named as a finalist for the HUGO BOSS ASIA ART Award for Emerging Asian Artists. He was also shortlisted for the 12th Benesse Prize 2019 for his work in the 6th Singapore Biennale. More recently, he received the inaugural Silvana S. Foundation Commission Award (Singapore) in 2020, the Excellence Award in the 44th New Cosmos of Photography competition (Japan) and the 2nd Prize (Still Images), Julius Baer Next Generation Art Prize in 2021.

Zhao has been featured in the 14th Gwangju Biennale (2023) and 10th Busan Biennale (2020), South Korea; Singapore Biennale 2019; 9th Asia Pacific Triennial of Contemporary Art, Australia, together with Singaporean artist Donna Ong and 11th Taipei Biennale (2018); JIWA: Jakarta Biennale 2017, Indonesia; 7th Moscow Biennale, Russia (2017) and 20th Biennale of Sydney (2016). His selected museum and solo exhibitions include Singapore, Very Old Tree (permanent exhibition), National Museum of Singapore; Monuments in the Forest (2023), ShanghART Gallery, China; Living Pictures: Photography in Southeast Asia (2022), National Gallery Singapore; Posthuman Ensemble (2021), Asia Culture Center, South Korea; From the Mundane World (2020), He Art Museum, China; The Lines We Draw (2019), Yalu River Art Museum, China; Effect (2019), Orange County Museum of Art, United States; Observe, Experiment, Archive (2019), Sunderland Museum & Winter Gardens, United Kingdom; New Forest (2019), Mind Set Art Center, Taiwan; A Guide to the Flora and Fauna of the World (2015), Centre of Contemporary Photography, Australia; The Tree That Fell (2015), The Substation, Singapore; and Landscape: the virtual, the actual, the possible? (2014) Yerba Buena Center for the Arts, United States; among others.

Zhao has also undertaken several residencies: Kadist Residencies, San Francisco, United States (2014); EOS ART, Earth Observatory of Singapore artist residency (2013); National Museum Cardiff, Residency by Chapter Arts Centre, United Kingdom (2012); Langgeng Art Foundation, Residency on Dutch Colonial Archives, Indonesia (2012); Bangkok University Gallery, Artist Residency, Thailand (2011); The Arctic Circle Residency, Norway (2011); Ffotogallery, Artist Residency, United Kingdom (2011); and Fukuoka Asian Art Museum, Residence Program, Japan (2010).

His work is in the collection of CBW Collection, Taiwan; Kadist, France and United States; Musée du quai Branly – Jacques Chirac, France; National Museum of Singapore; Singapore Art Museum; Equinor Art Programme, Norway; UBS Art Collection, UBS Global; UOB Art Collection, Singapore; Tate Collection, United Kingdom.
