= Art and China after 1989: Theater of the World =

Art and China after 1989: Theater of the World is an exhibition that took place at Solomon R. Guggenheim Museum in New York between October 6, 2017 – January 7, 2018. The exhibition presents works by seventy-one artists and artist collectives across China and worldwide, who define contemporary experience in and of China. Looking at a period between the Tiananmen Square Protests, which also coincides with the end of the Cold War, and the Beijing Olympics in 2008, the exhibition explores a time when "anything seemed possible" and artists from China sought visibility in the global art world. The curators of the exhibition write that the works in this exhibition respond to how China went through a radical transformation between 1989 and 2008, which had an unmatchable impact at the global level. The exhibition has been considered as "an invaluable window" onto the intersection of contemporary art, politics, and history, and as an opportunity to ask questions about the role of museums as sites of learning how one could be a global citizen today. It also traveled to Guggenheim Museum Bilbao and the San Francisco Museum of Modern Art in 2018 and 2019, respectively.

The exhibition caused controversy among animal rights activists for featuring three artworks involving animals and sparked public debate about both animal rights and art censorship. Because of claims of animal cruelty and the threats of violence, the museum decided to remove these works from the display "out of concern for the safety of its staff, visitors, and participating artists."

== Title of the exhibition ==
The title of the exhibition draws on Huang Yong Ping's installation "Theater of the World" (1993) where a large, cage-like structure hosts thousands of insects and reptiles that fight for survival and devour each other for the duration of the exhibition. The work draws on ideas from ancient Daoist cosmology, Michel Foucault's critique of modernity, and contemporary discussions about the realpolitik of globalization. The work was removed before the opening of the exhibition, following the controversy about claims of animal cruelty.

== Artists and curators ==
Art and China after 1989: Theater of the World has six sections. The first section titled "No U-Turn: 1989" includes works by Huang Yong Ping, Gu Dexin, Li Shan, Wu Shanzhuan, Xiao Lu, Zhang Nian, and Wang Xingwei. The second section titled "New Measurement: Analyzing the Situation" features works by Wang Guangyi, Tactile Sensation Group (Gu Dexin and Wang Luyan), Geng Jianyi, Zhang Peili, Wu Shanzhuan, Qiu Zhijie, Ding Yi, Yu Youhan, Huang Rui, and Wang Jianwei. The third section titled "5 Hours: Capitalism, Urbanism, Realism" presents works by Liu Zheng, Zhang Xiaogang, Zhao Bandi, Wang Youshen, Liu Xiaodong, Zeng Fanzhi, Yu Hong, Zhu Jia, Chen Zhen, Rem Koolhaas and Alain Fouraux, Big Tail Elephant Working Group (Chen Shaoxiaong, Liang Juhui, Lin Yilin, and Xu Tan), Ellen Pau, and Kwan Sheung Chi. The fourth section titled "Uncertain Pleasure: Acts of Sensation" includes works by Xu Bing, Wang Gongxin, Tehching Hsieh, Ai Weiwei, East Village, Feng Mengbo, Yin Xiuzhen, Song Dong, Lin Tianmiao, Xu Zhen, Sun Yuan and Peng Yu, Kan Xuan, and Yang Zhenzhong. The fifth section titled "Otherwhere: Travels Through the In-between" has works by Cai Guo-Qiang, Yang Jiechang, Wenda Gu, Song Dong, Liu Dan, Chen Zhen, Shen Yuan, Zhou Tiehai, Yan Lei, Yang Fudong, Zhang Hongtu, Xu Bing and Ai Weiwei, Liu Xiaodong, Huang Yong Ping, and Xu Bing. The sixth and the last section titled "Whose Utopia: Activism and Alternatives Circa 2008" features works by Xijing Men (Tsuyoshi Ozawa, Chen Shaoxiong, and Gimhongsok), Chen Chieh-jen, Long March Project, Shanghai Contemporary Art Archival Project, Cao Fei, and Zheng Guogu, Bishan Commune, Ai Weiwei, Cai Guo-Qiang, Sarah Morris, and Gu Dexin.

The exhibition is organized by Alexandra Munroe of Solomon R. Guggenheim Museum with guest co-curators Philip Tinari of Ullens Center for Contemporary Art in Beijing and Hou Hanru of MAXXI, National Museum of 21st Century Arts in Rome. Kyung An and Xiaorui Zhu-Nowell of the Guggenheim's Asian Art team provided curatorial assistance. The archive section was developed in collaboration with Asia Art Archive in Hong Kong.

== Controversy and removal of artworks ==
Following public criticism before the exhibition opened in New York, the Guggenheim removed three artworks involving animals from the exhibition. These include Sun Yuan and Peng Yu's video “Dogs That Cannot Touch Each Other” (2003) where eight pit bulls leashed to treadmills strain towards each other; Xu Bing's documentation of performance "A Case Study of Transference" (1994) where two live breeding pigs stamped in ink with words with Latin and Chinese characters copulate in front of a gallery audience; and Huang Yong Ping's installation "Theater of the World" (1993) where thousands of insects and reptiles, including gekkos, locusts, crickets, centipedes and cockroaches, walk on top of each other a tabletop with a see-through dome.

The museum cited “explicit and repeated threats of violence” as a reason to remove these artworks. Protesters demonstrated outside the museum, and both People for the Ethical Treatment of Animals (PETA) and the American Society for the Prevention of Cruelty to Animals (ASPCA) issued statements condemning the inclusion of the above controversial works. ASPCA stated that they support artistic expression but oppose any use of animals which results in pain or distress to the animals.

When the exhibition traveled to Bilbao in 2018, it included two of the three artworks in question.

== Funding ==
The exhibition is supported by the National Endowment for the Humanities and Henry Luce Foundation, as well as W.L.S. Spencer Foundation, the E. Rhodes and Leona B. Carpenter Foundation, The Nancy Foss Heath and Richard B. Heath Educational, Cultural and Environmental Foundation, the National Endowment for the Arts, and the New York State Council on the Arts.
