= Yelan (artist) =

Chinese artist (born 1977)

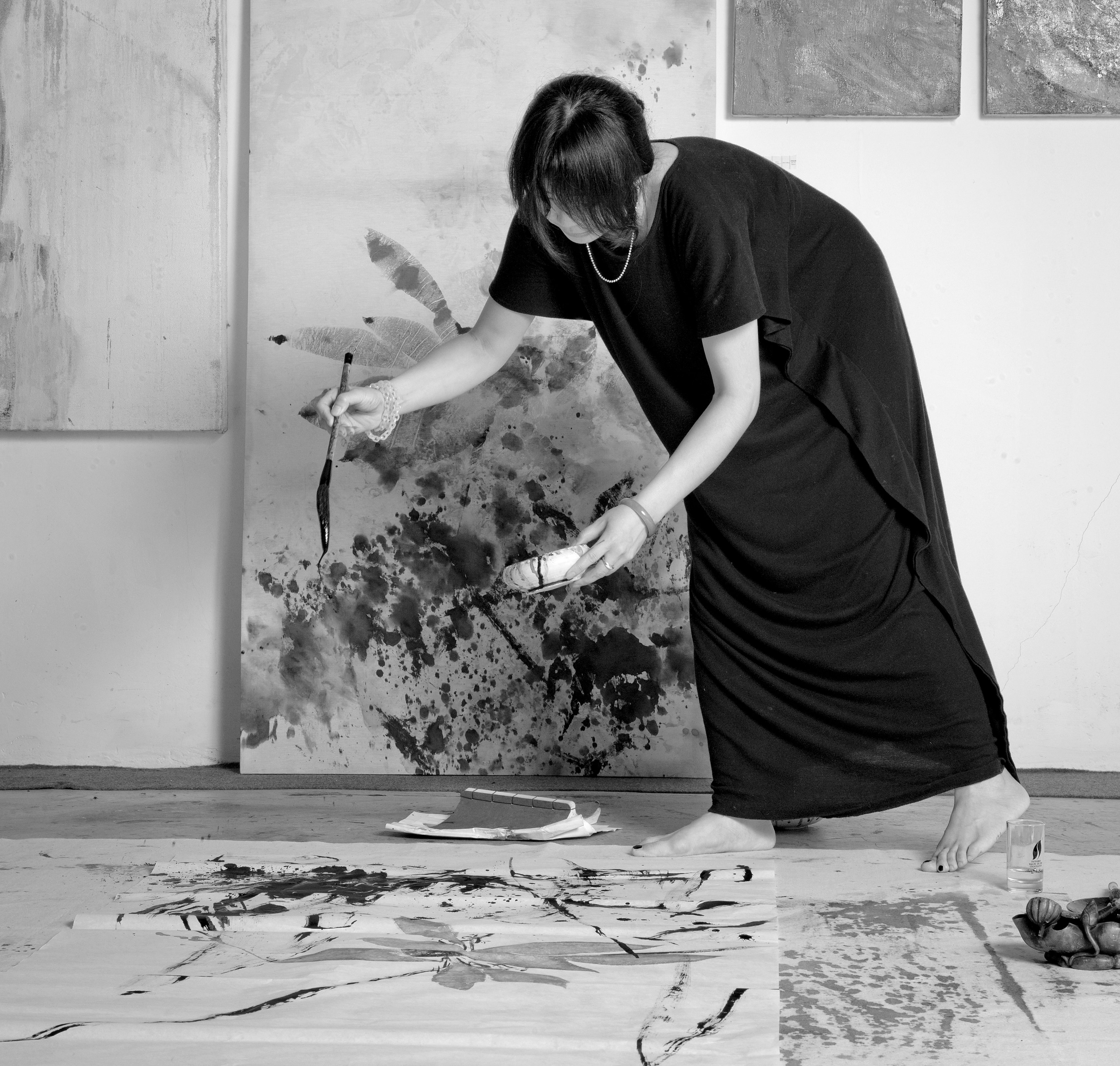
- Yelan in 2011
- Born: August 2, 1977 (age 49); Datong, Shanxi, China
- Occupation: Contemporary Artist
- Writing career
- Pen name: Yelan

Yelan (Chinese: 叶澜) is a contemporary Chinese artist in the People's Republic of China who lives and works in Shanghai.

Yelan began studying ink and oil painting from a young age. Her first major accomplishment occurred in her final years of high school when a Taiwanese private museum purchased a series of her Buddhist paintings. Yelan went on to study ink painting at Renmin University, graduating in 2004.

Yelan has held exhibitions in Beijing, Hong Kong, Tokyo, Paris, Chicago, as well as a number of other cities. Yelan's gallery and studio are both located at 50 Moganshan Road.

Yelan published her first book, 自然而然, in 2018.
