= Zhang Ding =

Chinese artist (born 1980)

Zhang Ding (Chinese: 张鼎; born 1980) is a Chinese artist.

Zhang was born in 1980 in Zhangye, Gansu, China, and is based in Shanghai. He graduated from Oil Painting department of Northwest Minzu University in 2003. During 2003–2004, he studied at the China Academy of Art. In 2016, Zhang Ding founded the art label Con Trol Club.

Zhang Ding's exhibitions and projects often include videos, sculptures, installations, paintings, real time renderings and live performances.

== Solo exhibitions ==
- 2019

High-Speed Forms, OCAT Shanghai, Shanghai

- 2018

Safe House, Beijing

- 2017

Vortex, ShanghART, Shanghai

- 2016

Zhang Ding: Devouring Time, RAM HIGHLIGHT 2016, Rockbund Art Museum, Shanghai

Enter the Dragon II, K11 Art Museum, Shanghai

ZHANG Ding- 18 Cubes, Solo Project in Art Basel HK 2016 Encounter Section, Hong Kong Convention & Exhibition Centre, Hong Kong

- 2015

Enter the Dragon, ICA, London, UK

Black Substance, Shanghai Museum of Glass, Shanghai

- 2014

Zhang Ding: Orbit of Rock, ShanghART, Beijing

Orbit, The Armory Show, Focus Section, New York, U.S.A.

- 2013

Gold & Silver, Galerie Krinzinger, Austria

- 2012

Buddha Jumps over the Wall, Top Contemporary Art Centre, Shanghai

- 2011

Opening, ShanghART H- Space, Shanghai

- 2009

Law, ShanghART, Beijing

- 2008

ZhangDing, Wind, Krinzinger Projecte, Vienna, Austria

- 2007

Tools, ShanghART, Shanghai

N Kilometers Towards the West, 2006, ShanghART F- Space, Shanghai

- 2006

My Photographs Exhibition, Shanghai

- 2005

Big City, BizArt, Shanghai

== Prizes ==
- 2015 TANC Asia Prize Winner;
- 2017 Porsche Young Chinese Artist of the Year Prize Winner.

== Collection ==
- Multimedia Art Museum, Moscow, Russia
- Astrup Fearnley Museum, Oslo, Norway
- DSL Collection, Beijing
- Guy & Myriam Ullens Foundation, Switzerland
