= Yang Fudong =

Chinese contemporary artist

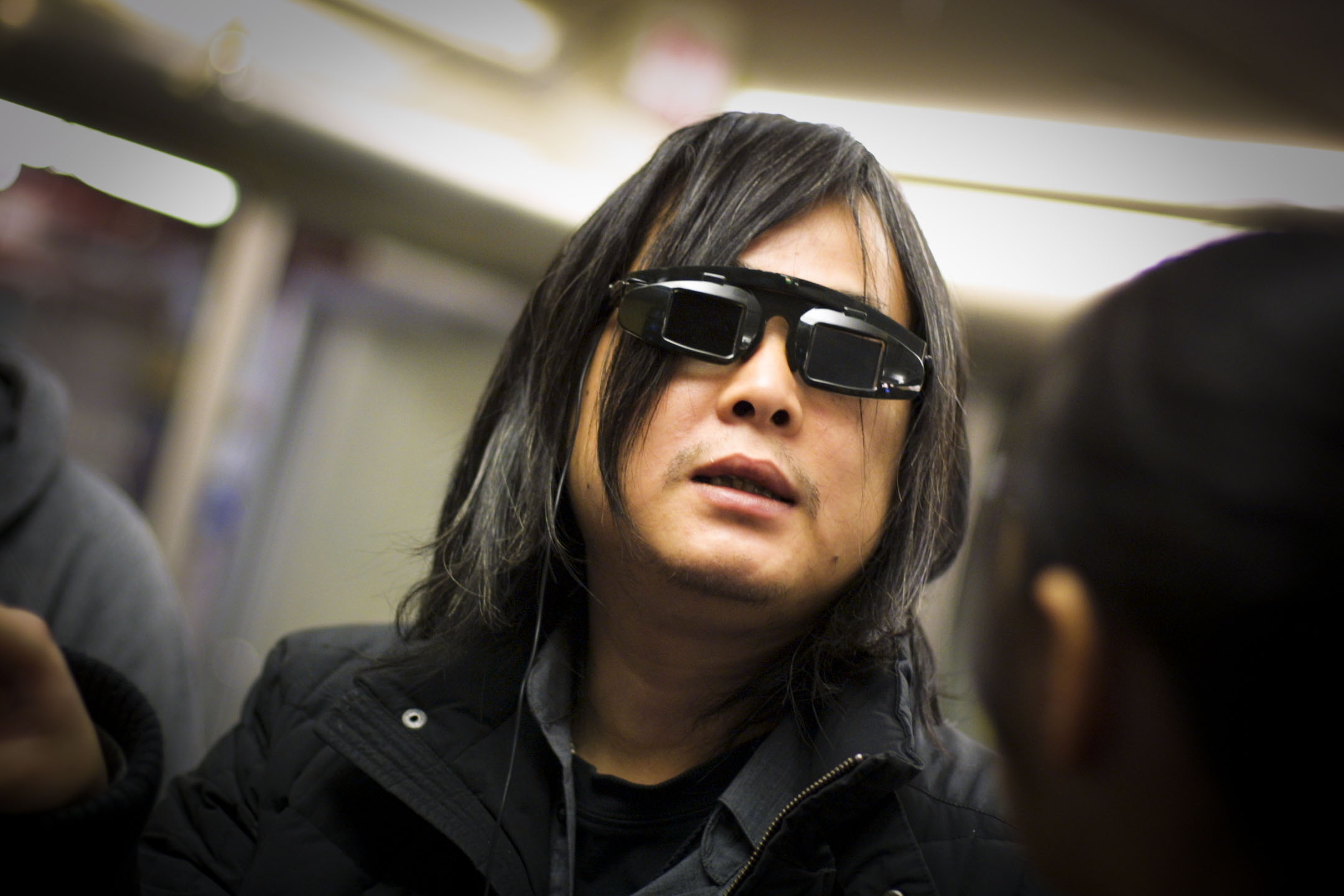
Yang Fudong

Yang Fudong (杨福东; born 1971 in Beijing) is a Chinese contemporary artist. In the early 1990s, he began to work with film. He began creating films and videos using 35 mm film. Currently Yang directs films, creates photographs, and creates video installations.

Yang is known to explore themes that are historical, social, and political by juxtaposing contradictions between current social issues, with cultural norms. A fan of the abstract and fragmented storyline, he tends to create sequences that are long and suspended, with the use of black-and-white as a constant. Yang's work has a nostalgic feel that incorporates the lyrical harmony of traditional handscrolls with the expressiveness of new wave cinema that is reminiscent of Jim Jarmusch, someone he admires. Yang Fudong's most popular works include: Seven Intellectuals in a Bamboo Forrest, The Fifth Night, the 17th Biennale of Sydney, East of Que Village, An Estranged Paradise, Backyard- Hey! Sun is Rising, and No Snow on the Broken Bridge.

His work has been exhibited in China through avant-garde exhibitions in the late 1990s and has been consequently shown in many countries including solo presentations in Parasol Unit, London (2011); National Museum of Contemporary Art, Athens (2010); Asia Society, New York (2009); Kunsthalle Wien, Vienna (2005); Castello di Rivoli, Torino (2005); and the Renaissance Society, Chicago (2004). In 2013, Kunsthalle Zurich and Berkeley Art Museum & Pacific Film Archive co-organized his first retrospective exhibition. Recent exhibitions include Yang Fudong at the Wolverhampton Art Gallery, UK; Moving Mountains, OCAT Xi'an, China (both 2017) and Filmscapes, at ACMI, Melbourne (Australian Centre for the Moving Image) which traveled to the Auckland Art Gallery Toi o Tamaki, New Zealand (2015-2016). Yang Fudong has participated in prestigious international art events including the Sharjah Biennial, UAE (2013); Venice Biennale, Italy (2003 and 2007); The Asia Pacific Triennial of Contemporary Art, Australia (2006); Documenta XI, Germany (2002). He is represented by and regularly exhibits his work at Chinese contemporary art gallery ShanghART Gallery.

== Education ==
Yang graduated in oil painting from China Academy of Fine Arts in Hangzhou in 1995.

== Works ==
=== East of Que Village ===
East of Que Village is a six-channel film with black and white color. It shows a wild pack of dogs looking to scavenge in a small northern Chinese town on the outskirts of Beijing. This small rural town seems to bring up memories of Yang's own childhood and his hometown. The town is empty and basically evacuated. Yang Fudong is trying to show how contemporary China has moved away from its traditions and from a certain part of life. Yang shows the dogs struggling to find food until they turn against each other just for survival. There is a small group of people the dogs come across which immediately makes the viewer feel the humans must also be struggling to survive in the same way the dogs are. Yang Fudong shows a strong question of whether or not the contemporary movement in China is helping the country or making them weaker. He relates this film to his own personal life as well as his own experiences. It shows the isolation and emptiness every human feels at one point in their life. This film has a couple of messages in it but it does not overload the viewer. Yang Fudong gives one overall message to the audience to create an experience from which they can grow. The whole experience is important. There are six screens all playing at the same time with different film going on them. The whole viewing area is overwhelmed with the sounds of barking and the sounds of people (from the film). Yang Fudong captures the audience with his interesting work and his simply conveyed themes.

=== No Snow on the Broken Bridge ===
This is one of Yang Fudong's more personal works. This is a black and white film that is viewed on many different screens just as East of Que Village. In this film, Yang describes the troubles and difficulties for young people face growing up in a world heading towards modernism. Yang Fudong is one of these young people who are trying to find their way in the modern world. They do not want to discard all tradition but they realize the fast-growing world is all around them. No Snow on the Broken Bridge shows the experiences and emotions that Yang Fudong feels towards this movement and it portrays how his generation fells. Yang Fudong shows the isolation and alienation young intellectuals feel is today's society. This film is another example of how he captures the feelings of a whole generation in his films.

=== The Fifth Night ===
This is another video installation by Yang Fudong, one of his more recent films. It is a black-and-white film set in old Shanghai. The work is presented on seven large-screen televisions arranged across a total width of 21 meters. In this film, Yang departs from his earlier style and instead uses an approach he calls the "multiple-views file." This technique presents actors' expressions as if they were unscripted or uncontrolled. The seven cameras allow each actor's emotions to be shown from multiple angles. Yang has stated that this method aims to create an immersive experience for the viewer. The piece contributed to Yang's existing reputation within Chinese filmmaking.

=== Seven Intellectuals in a Bamboo Forest ===
The film Seven Intellectuals in a Bamboo Forest is based on the story of seven intellectual individuals who come from the Wei and Jin Dynasty. Yang Fudong provides the audience with the name of the seven intellectuals: Ruan Ji, Ji Kang, Shan Tao, Liu Ling, Ruan Yan, Xiang Xiu and Wang Rong. These seven intellectuals, five men and two women, were all either poets or writers during the Wei or Jin Dynasty. These seven individuals attempt to escape the pressures of the world and retreat to the bamboo forest together. They are all well dressed with suitcases. In the forest they gather to drink. These seven intellectuals become unruly, singing songs and playing instruments that were popular in these dynasties. Yang Fudong expressed these individuals expressing individuality from the rest of the world, as well as freedom from the pressures that pursued them in their lives. These individuals are widely known for their passion and talent in regard to writing and poetry. They lay naked on a rocky point on the Yellow Mountain (Anhui Providence). The seven intellectuals indulged in many things including; feasting on dried fish, drinking, and sexual activities. Yang Fudong makes these seven intellectuals look as if they are young and careless, one never would have guessed that these people are the smartest and most talented people of their generation. The group then decides to take up a mountainside for rice farming. These people work very hard plowing and planting seeds. They are no longer dressed in their fancy clothes, instead, they are barefoot and in rags. While rice farming the seven intellectuals become very close with nature. They meditate on their sense of alienation and learn to appreciate what they have. Eventually, they go back to city life which confuses them due to their previous experiences. Upon return to the city they are confused and have no real direction in life. Even though they are back in Shanghai, where they originated, they feel lost because of all the new skyscrapers and buildings. This is one of Yang Fudong's most famous works. This film has been shown all around the world and has been appreciated by all of them. Fudong captures the regret that his own generation has because they follow their dreams, as these seven intellectuals did. Yang provides a simple message for a very long film so it could be appreciated by all audiences, Chinese or not. This is a timeless piece of art. It can be appreciated by this generation as well as future generations. Yang Fudong does not contaminate his film with subjects or vents that only one generation can understand; instead, he leaves most of it open to interpretation to each individual person. "The films play simultaneously here, instead of succession as they did in Venice. I recommend watching Part I and Part V in their entirely, since these two sections best capture the conflicts and regrets of Yang's generation of Chinese dreamers. The other films, while imaginative and haunting, are better savored in small doses."-Barbara Pollack

=== The Light That I Feel ===
The film was created during the summer of 2014 at Sandhornøy in Norway together with local actors and dancers. He produced an outdoor, site-specific film installation for the beautiful and ever-changing landscape. "I think about how to tell a narrative by using not people speaking so much, but how the wind tells a narrative, or how trees tell a narrative", he says. Silence is an important part of his work, inspired by an Eastern tradition where meaning cannot be spoken but is understood by the heart. The films bring together the old and the new, ancient wisdom and landscapes, and the idea of the collective with the more rootless and doubting approach of the urban individual. To describe it he says, "It's a feeling of yesterday, but it's actually tomorrow." Yang Fudong shows a sensitive and responsive approach in his work; his films touch upon questions around identity connected to history and heritage and the existential challenges of contemporary life. His grand, slow and poetic cinematic language counters the natural scenery on the Arctic island in an extraordinary way.

=== Moving Mountains ===
"Moving Mountains" is a myth from the "Liezi Tangwen," a text by the Chinese Warring States period thinker Lie Yukou. It tells of an old man and his family who, undeterred by hardship, dig away at mountains, ultimately impressing the God Emperor and moving the mountains. Artist Yang Fudong encountered this story in his youth and was deeply moved by the family's unyielding spirit. He was also inspired by Xu Beihong’s 1940 painting "Moving Mountains," which vividly depicted the characters and conveyed a sense of perseverance. Yang’s 46-minute black-and-white film, "Moving Mountains," is a poetic reflection on human nature and shifting values. Drawing on the painting’s characters and scenes, he reinterprets the story in a contemporary context, blending ancient tales with modern themes. The film explores determination and resilience, showing how these timeless qualities persist through significant changes, embodying the spirit of the times.

== Quotes About Yang Fudong ==
"Yang Fudong's work epitomises how the recent and rapid modernisation of China challenges traditional values and culture," Dr Sherman, Executive Director of SCAF (Sherman Contemporary Art Foundation), said. "He skillfully balances this dichotomy to create works endowed with classic beauty and timelessness. His works investigate the structure and formation of identity through myth, personal memory and lived experience."

== Exhibitions ==
=== Current and upcoming shows ===
- The Light That I Feel, SALT Sandhornøy Norway, Aug 29, 2014 - Sep 6 2015
- ALTROVE: Yang Fudong, Gagliano del Capo, Italy, July 26 - September 4, 2014
- Yang Fudong's New Women, A Century of Chinese Cinema, TIFF Bell Lightbox, Toronto, June 7 to August 11
- Shanghart Taopu, ShanghART Taopu, Shanghai, Jan 01, 2010 - Dec 31, 2012
- Face, Minsheng Art Museum, Shanghai, Mar 10, 2012 - May 20, 2012
- 60-Minute Cinema, Chinese Arts Centre, Manchester, UK, Apr 27, 2012 - Jun 09, 2012
- Yang Fudong - The Fifth Night, Vancouver Art Gallery, Vancouver, Canada, May 12, 2012 - Sep 03, 2012
- Yang Fudong: Close to the Sea•The Revival of the Snake, ShanghART Beijing, May 12, 2012 - Jun 15, 2012
- The First Kyiv International Biennial of Contemporary Art ARSENALE 2012, the Best of Times, the Worst of Times. Rebirth and Apocalypse in Contemporary Art., Mystetskyi Arsenal, Kyiv, Ukraine, May 17, 2012 - Jul 31, 2012
- ART HK 12-Hong Kong International Art Fair- Booth Nr. 3A09, Art Fairs Hong Kong Convention Center, Hong Kong, May 17, 2012 - May 20, 2012
- Yang Fudong: Filmscapes, Australian Centre for the Moving Image, Melbourne, Australia, Dec 4, 2014 - Mar 15, 2015

=== Solo exhibitions ===
2024	Yang Fudong M+ Facade Film "Sparrow on the Sea", M+ Museum, Hong Kong
2023	Yang Fudong: North Hill Art Basel 2023, Booth R24, Basel, Switzerland
2021	Yang Fudong: Twelve Towers, Meta Ziwu, Shanghai
2021	“Yang Fudong—from Yejiang/The Nightman Cometh to Dawn Breaking”, Portland, U.S.A.
2020	Endless Peaks, ShanghART, Shanghai
2019	Yang Fudong: Beyond GOD and Evil - Enemies of Truth | West Bund Art & Design 2019, West Bund Art Center, Shanghai
2019	Moving Mountains / Mägesid Liigutades, Fotografiska Tallinn, Halls 3. and 4, Estonia
2019	Push the Door Softly and Walk in, Or Just Stay Standing Where You Are, Fosun Foundation, Shanghai
2019	Beyond GOD & Evil - Preface, Marian Goodman Gallery, London, U.K.
2018	Yang Fudong "Dawn Breaking", A Museum Film Project 2018, Long Museum West Bund, Shanghai
2018	Moving Mountains, SCAD Museum of Art, 601 Turner Blvd. Savannah, Georgia, U.S.A.
2017	The Coloured Sky, New Women II, Espace Louis Voitton, Tokyo, Japan
2017	Moving Mountains, OCAT Xi'an, Xi'an
2016	Moving Mountains, Shanghai Center of Photography, Shanghai
2016	Yang Fudong, The Light That I Feel, Daegu Art Museum, Daegue, Korea
2016	The Coloured Sky: New Women II, Platform-L Contemporary Art Center, Seoul, Korea
2015	Yang Fudong: Filmscapes, Auckland Art Gallery Toi o Tamaki, Auckland, New Zealand
2015	Twin Tracks: Yang Fudong Solo Exhibition, Yuz Museum, Shanghai
2015	Yang Fudong: Flutter, Flutter... Jasmine, Jasmine, Manggha Museum of Japanese Art and Technology, Kraków, Poland
2015	The Coloured Sky: New Women II, Marian Goodman Gallery, Paris, France
2014	Yang Fudong: Incidental Scripts, CCA Singapore, Singapore
2014	Yang Fudong: Filmscapes, China Close up, Australian Centre for the Moving Image, Melbourne, Australia
2014	The Light That I Feel, SALT outdoor video installation, Sandhornøya, Norway
2014	Altrove: Yang Fudong, Capo d' Arte, Italy
2014	Yang Fudong - Art Unlimited Art Basel 2014, Basel, Switzerland
2014	Yang Fudong: East of Que Village, Logan Center in The University of Chicago, Chicago, U.S.A.
2013	Yang Fudong: Estranged Paradise, Works 1993-2013, Berkeley Art Museum, San Francisco, U.S.A.
2013	Yang Fudong: Estranged Paradise, Works 1993-2013, Kunsthalle Zürich, Switzerland
2013	Yejiang / The Nightman Cometh, ShanghART Singapore, Singapore
2012	Quote Out of Context, Solo Exhibition of Yang Fudong, OCT Contemporary Art Terminal, Shanghai
2012	YANG Fudong: Close to the Sea·The Revival of the Snake, ShanghART Beijing, Beijing
2012	Yang Fudong - The Fifth Night, Vancouver Art Gallery, Vancouver, Canada
2012	Yang Fudong, Marian Goodman Gallery, New York, USA
2011	The Distance of Reality, Yang Fudong's Solo Exhibition, Wifredo Lam Contemporary Art Center, Havaianas, Cuba
2011	Yang Fudong, Utopia and Reality, Espoo Museum of Modern Art, Tapiola, Finland
2011	One Half of August, Yang Fudong Solo Exhibition, Parasol Unit Foundation for Contemporary Art, London, U.K.
2011	Yang Fudong: No Snow on the Broken Bridge, Sherman Contemporary Art Foundation, Sydney, Australia (traveling, Institute of Modern Art, Brisbane, Australia )
2011	Yang Fudong, Marian Goodman Gallery, Paris, France
2011	Three Films by Yang Fudong, Moving Image Gallery, Singapore Art Museum (SAM) at 8Q, Singapore
2010	...In the Bamboo Forest..., Kunsthaus Baselland, Basel, Switzerland
2010	Yang Fudong: Seven Intellectuals in a Bamboo Forest and Other Stories, National Museum of Contemporary Art, Athens, Greece
2010	Yang Fudong Solo Exhibition, Kino Kino, Sandnes, Norway
2009	Dawn Mist, Separation Faith, Yang Fudong's Solo Exhibition, Zendai Museum of Modern Art, Shanghai
2009	Yang Fudong: East of Que Village, Marian Goodman Gallery, New York, U.S.A.
2009	Yang Fudong: Seven Intellectuals in a Bamboo Forest, Asia Society and Museum, New York, U.S.A.
2009	Yang Fudong: East of Que Village, MuHKA Media, Antwerpen, Belgium
2009	Yang Fudong, Seven Intellectuals in the Bamboo Forest Part 1-5, Paco das Artes Organizao Social de Cultura, Sao Paulo, Brazil
2009	Yang Fudong, MCA Denver, Denver, U.S.A.
2008	Yang Fudong: the General's Smile, Hara Museum, Tokyo, Japan
2008	Yang Fudong, Marian Goodman Gallery, Paris, France
2008	Yang Fudong: Seven Intellectuals in Bamboo Forest I, Espoo Art Museum Foundation, Espoo, Finland
2008	Yang Fudong: The 7 Intellectuals in the Bamboo Forest I-V, Jarla Partilager, Sweden
2008	Ms.Huang at M Last Night: Yang Fudong Solo Exhibition, Shanghai Art Fair, Outstanding Artists Section, ShanghaiMART, Shanghai
2008	Yang Fudong East of Que Village, ShanghART Main Space, Shanghai
2008	Yang Fudong, China in Transition, GL STRAND, Copenhagen, Denmark
2008	Yang Fudong, Museo de Arte Contemporáneo Esteban Vicente, Spain
2007	No Snow on the Broken Bridge, Yang Fudong Solo Exhibition, ShanghART H-Space, Shanghai
2006	Annette Messager & Yang Fudong, Marian Goodman Gallery, New York, U.S.A.
2006	Half Hitching Post, Yang Fudong's Solo Exhibition, 2577 Longhua Road, Shanghai
2006	No Snow on the Broken Bridge, Yang Fudong Solo Exhibition, Parasol Unit, London, U.K.
2005	Yang Fudong Recent Films and Videos, Stedelijk Museum, Amsterdam, Netherlands
2005	Yang Fudong, Estranged Paradise, Mead Gallery, Warwick Arts Centre, University of Warwick, Coventry, U.K.
2005	Yang Fudong, Castello di Rivoli Museo d'arte contemporanea, Torino, Italy
2005	Yang Fudong: Don't worry, it will be better..., Kunsthalle, Wien, Austria
2005	Yang Fudong, Marian Goodman Gallery, Paris, France
2004	Recent Works by Yang Fudong, Redcat (Roy and Etna Disney Cal Arts Theater), Los Angeles, USA
2004	5 Films, The Renaissance Society, Chicago, U.S.A.
2004	Yang Fudong: Seven Intellectuals in Bamboo Forest, curated by Hans Ulrich Obrist, Trans>Area, New York, U.S.A.
2004	An evening with Yang Fudong, MediaScope, New York, U.S.A.
2004	Yang Fudong, Sketch the Gallery, London, U.K.
2004	Yang Fudong, Galleria Raucci Santamaria, TAMARIA, Napoli, Italy
2004	Breeze, Yang Fudong, Galerie Judin Belot, Zurich, Switzerland
2003	S10, Siemens Arts Program: "What are they doing here?", Shanghai Siemens Business Communication Systems ltd., Shanghai
2003	Seven Intellectuals in Bamboo Forest and Selected Works on Video, The Moore Space, Miami, USA
2003	Yang Fudong, Buero Friedrich, Berlin, Germany
2003	The Paradise [12], The Douglas Hyde Gallery, Dublin, Ireland
2003	Movie Night at MK2, MK2 Bibliothèque, Paris, France
