= Melati Suryodarmo =

Indonesian performance artist

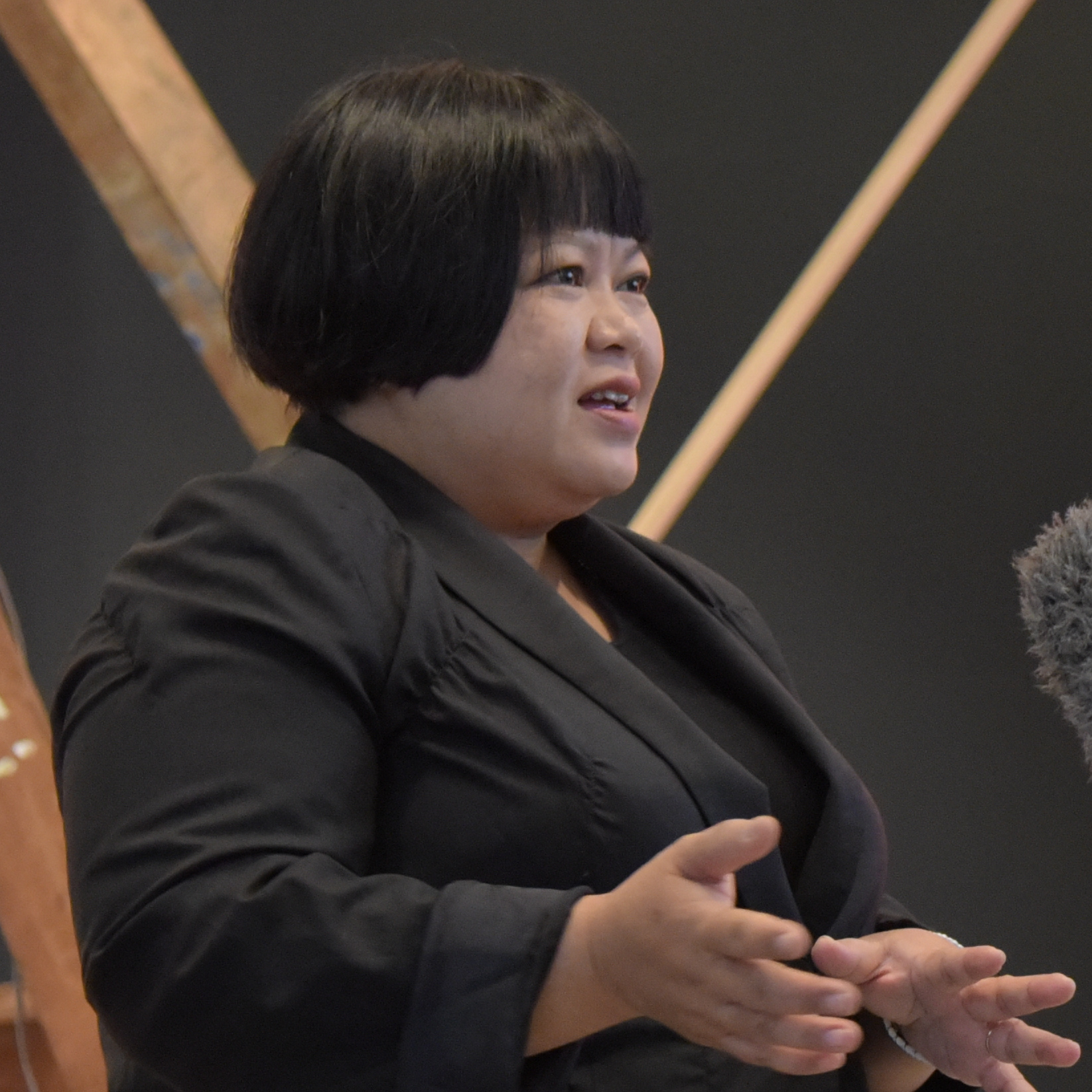
- Suryodarmo in 2019
- Born: 12 July 1969 (age 57); Surakarta, Indonesia
- Education: Padjadjaran University; Braunschweig University of Art
- Known for: Performance art endurance art
- Notable work: Exergie – Butter Dance

Melati Suryodarmo (born 12 July 1969) is an Indonesian durational performance artist. Her physically demanding performances make use of repetitive motions and often last for many hours, sometimes reaching "a level of factual absurdity". Suryodarmo has performed and exhibited throughout Europe and Asia as well as in North America. Born in Surakarta, she attended Padjadjaran University, graduating with a degree in international relations before moving to Germany. She lived there for 20 years, studying performance art at the Braunschweig University of Art with Butoh choreographer Anzu Furukawa and performance artist Marina Abramović.

Suryodarmo later returned to Indonesia and founded Undisclosed Territory, an annual festival for performance art. She was the first woman to serve as artistic director for the Jakarta Biennale. Suryodarmo has been called "one of the most famous performance artists to come out of Indonesia." In 2022, she was awarded the eleventh Bonnefanten Award for Contemporary Art (BACA) by the Bonnefantemuseum.

== Early life and education ==
Melati Suryodarmo was born on 12 July 1969 in Surakarta, Indonesia. Her mother, a traditional Javanese dancer, died when she was young. Her father, Suprapto "Prapto" Suryodarmo, was a meditative performer and practitioner of Amerta. Melati has been a dancer since she was a child. She learned Tai Chi early on and began learning Sumarah mediation at the age of 11. Suryodarmo attended Padjadjaran University in Bandung. She participated in student demonstrations against the Suharto regime in late 1980s and was part of the underground student association. She graduated with a degree in international relations and politics in 1993. Suryodarmo was involved in theatre and dance performances from 1988 to 1995.

Suryodarmo left Indonesia in 1994, moving to Braunschweig, Germany. She found work retouching photographs and planned to continue her studies in international relations. Following a chance meeting at the city's botanical gardens with Japanese Butoh choreographer Anzu Furukawa, Suryodarmo developed an interest in performance art. She studied sculpture and performance art at the Braunschweig University of Art under Furukawa, who she describes as her "biggest influence in thinking." In addition to learning Butoh from Furukawa, Suryodarmo also learned choreography, costume design and staging. In 1996, she was part of the dance performance Kashya-kashya Muttiku with Yuko Negoro at FBZ in Braunschweig. Suryodarmo later took classes from performance artist Marina Abramović. Suryodarmo received a fine arts degree in 2001 and an MFA in performance art in 2002. She later worked as an assistant for Abramović. Suryodarmo performed as a "living installation" alongside her former professor during the 2003 Venice Biennale. Suryodarmo also studied time-based art with Mara Mattuschka.

== Art career ==
After living in Germany for 20 years, Suryodarmo moved back to Indonesia in 2013. There she has worked towards popularising performance art in the country. Suryodarmo founded the performance art festival Undisclosed Territory in 2007 in her hometown of Solo. The annual festival includes workshops for youth featuring local artists. In 2012, she converted her home studio into Studio Plesungan, an art lab for Undisclosed Territory and performance art workshops. From 2013 to 2016, Suryodarmo served as guest lecturer at Indonesian Institute of the Arts, Yogyakarta.

In 2017, Suryodarmo was the first woman to have the role of artistic director for the Jakarta Biennale. She had a solo exhibition at Museum Macan in 2020.

== Works ==
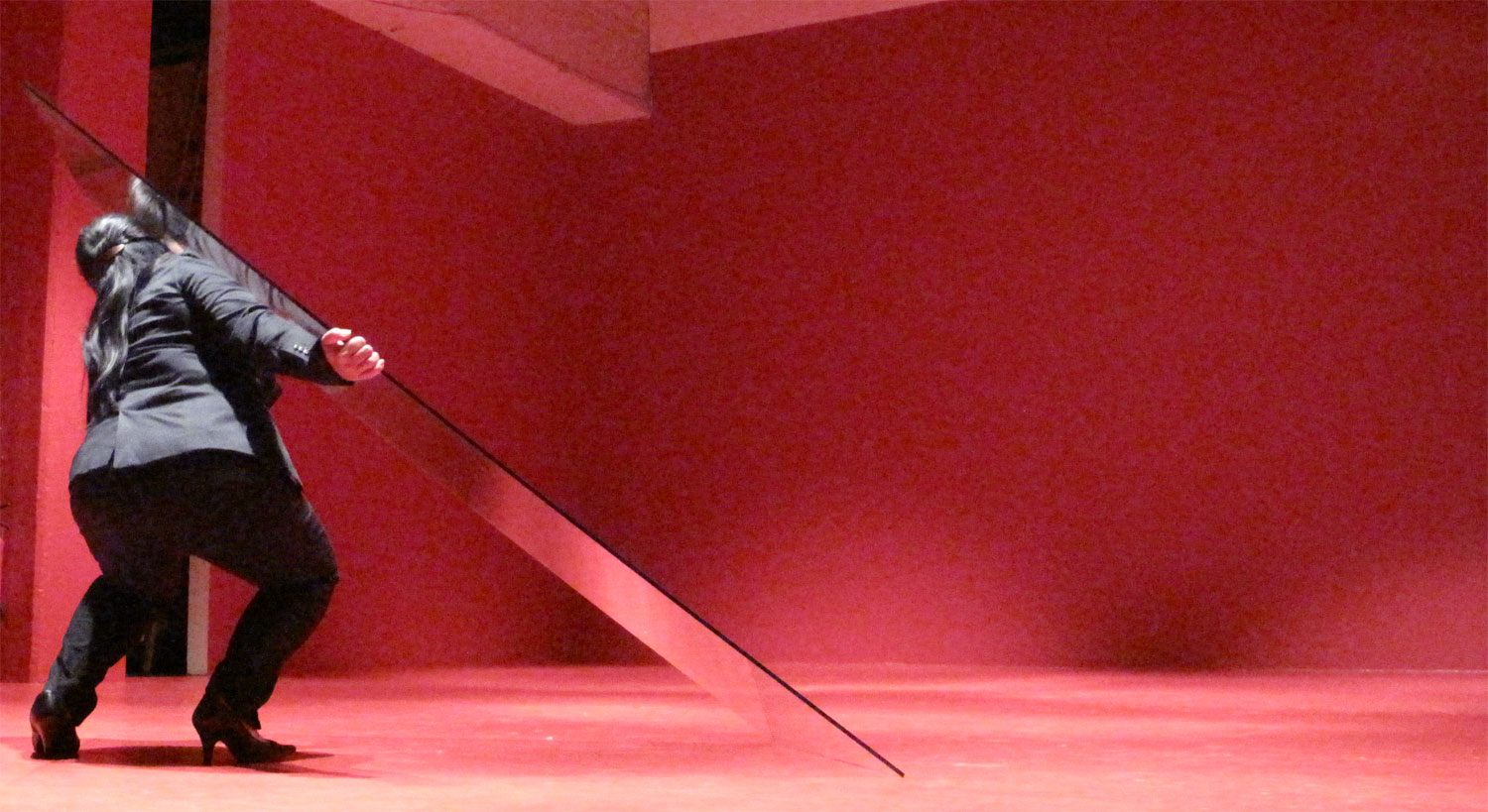
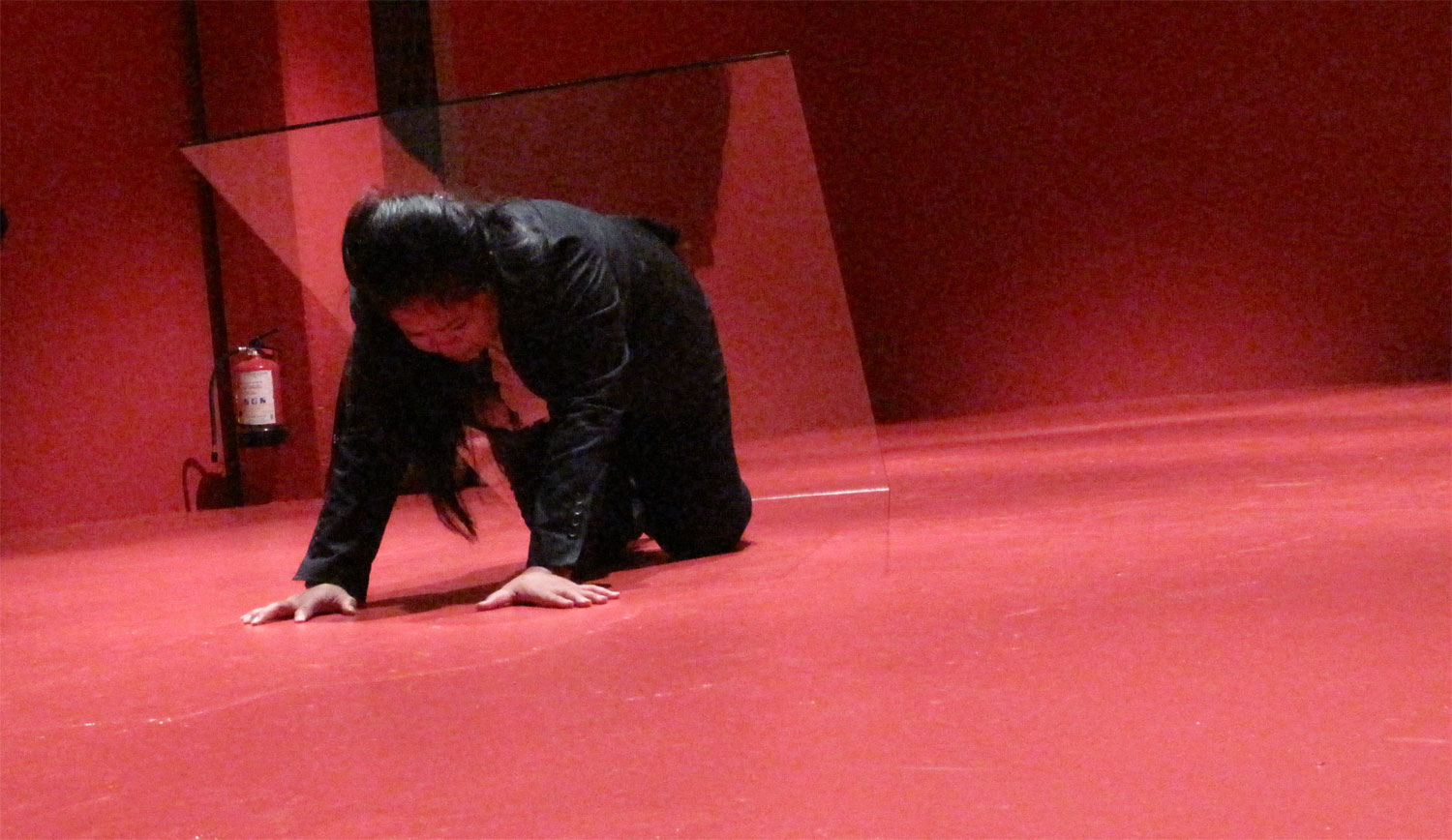
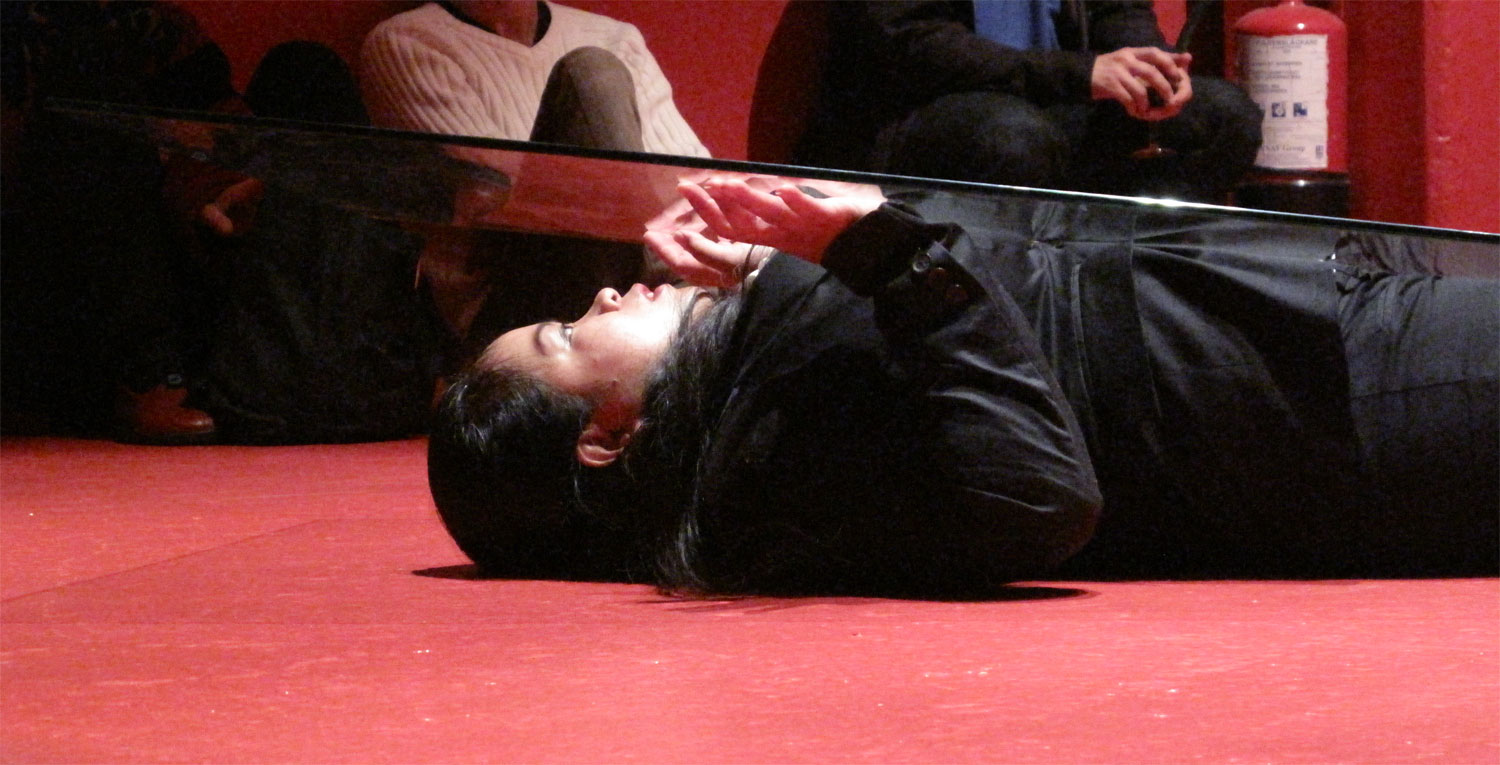
Suryodarmo performing I Love You in 2009.

Suryodarmo typically produces one or two new performances every year. Many of Suryodarmo's pieces are physically demanding, durational forms of performance art. Her use of repetitive motions in long performances creates meaning by stripping down movement and actions to their barest essentials. Rather than plan out her emotions for her pieces, Suryodarmo is "planning a platform of action with many considerations of thought." Suryodarmo has said of her work, "I intend to touch the fluid border between the body and its environment through my art works. I aim to create a concentrated level of intensity without the use of narrative structures. ...I love it when a performance reaches a level of factual absurdity." Aside from performance art, she also works in installation, video, and photography. She has performed throughout Europe and Asia as well as in North America.

In a review of Suryodarmo's works, Michelle Antoinette wrote that her performance art is a "vehicle for coming to terms with conflicting aspects of her identity," particularly as a woman within the context of Indonesian culture and cross-culturally as a resident of both Germany and Indonesia. In a review for ArtAsiaPacific, Eva McGovern-Basa writes that Suryodarmo's long durational pieces often involve repetitive actions that "deal with physical restraint, resistance and transformation as well as the contemplation of carefully selected objects and environments that trigger poetic movement."

=== Exergie – Butter Dance ===
Exergie – Butter Dance is among Suryodarmo's most iconic works. She debuted the 20-minute performance in 2000 at Berlin's Hebbel Theatre. Suryodarmo enters to the sound of ceremonial Indonesian drumming that usually accompanies the Pakarena, a Bugis dance from Makassar, South Sulawesi. Wearing high-heeled shoes and a fitted black dress, she begins dancing, treading on 20 blocks of butter that have been arranged on the floor. As the tempo of the drumming increases and the butter melts, she slips and drops to the ground. After each fall, she stands up and begins to dance again, repeating the entire process. The anticipation of each inevitable fall creates a tension for the audience, generating both sympathy and fascination at her perseverance despite the apparent futility of her actions. The work sprang from an assignment by her teacher Abramović for students to create a piece using only €10. Exergie – Butter Dance has had over 20 separate performances. According to Suryodarmo, "the aim of making this work is to get up. You can fail, but you do it anyway. You seldom expose how to get up when you fail."

An edited video of Exergie – Butter Dance was uploaded to YouTube as the "Adele Butter Dance" in 2012. In the video, Suryodarmo's 2010 performance at the Lilith Performance Studio is paired with Adele's 2011 song "Someone Like You". By 2014, the video had received over 1 million views, prompting an article about her in The New York Times. In the article, Rachel Will wrote that the video turned Suryodarmo into "one of the most famous performance artists to come out of Indonesia."

=== Why Let the Chicken Run? ===
Why Let the Chicken Run? is a 15-minute performance where Suryodarmo chases a chicken. The work, first performed in 2001, is a response to Ana Mendieta's 1972 work, Death of a Chicken. The work symbolises people's "relentless pursuits in life."

=== Lullaby for the Ancestors ===
In Suryodarmo's 2001 piece Lullaby for the Ancestors she repeatedly walks in a circle around a horse while cracking a whip then dunks her head in a bucket of water. The work is based on Jaran Kepang, a traditional Javanese dance where the dancers enter a trance and endure physical trials.

=== Alé Lino ===
In Suryodarmo's 2003 piece Alé Lino, she spends three hours leaning into a 4 m (13 ft) pole resting on her solar plexus. Inspired by her research into the Bissu, an androgynous gender of the Bugis people, Alé Lino is an exploration of the "physicality of emptiness".

=== The Black Ball ===
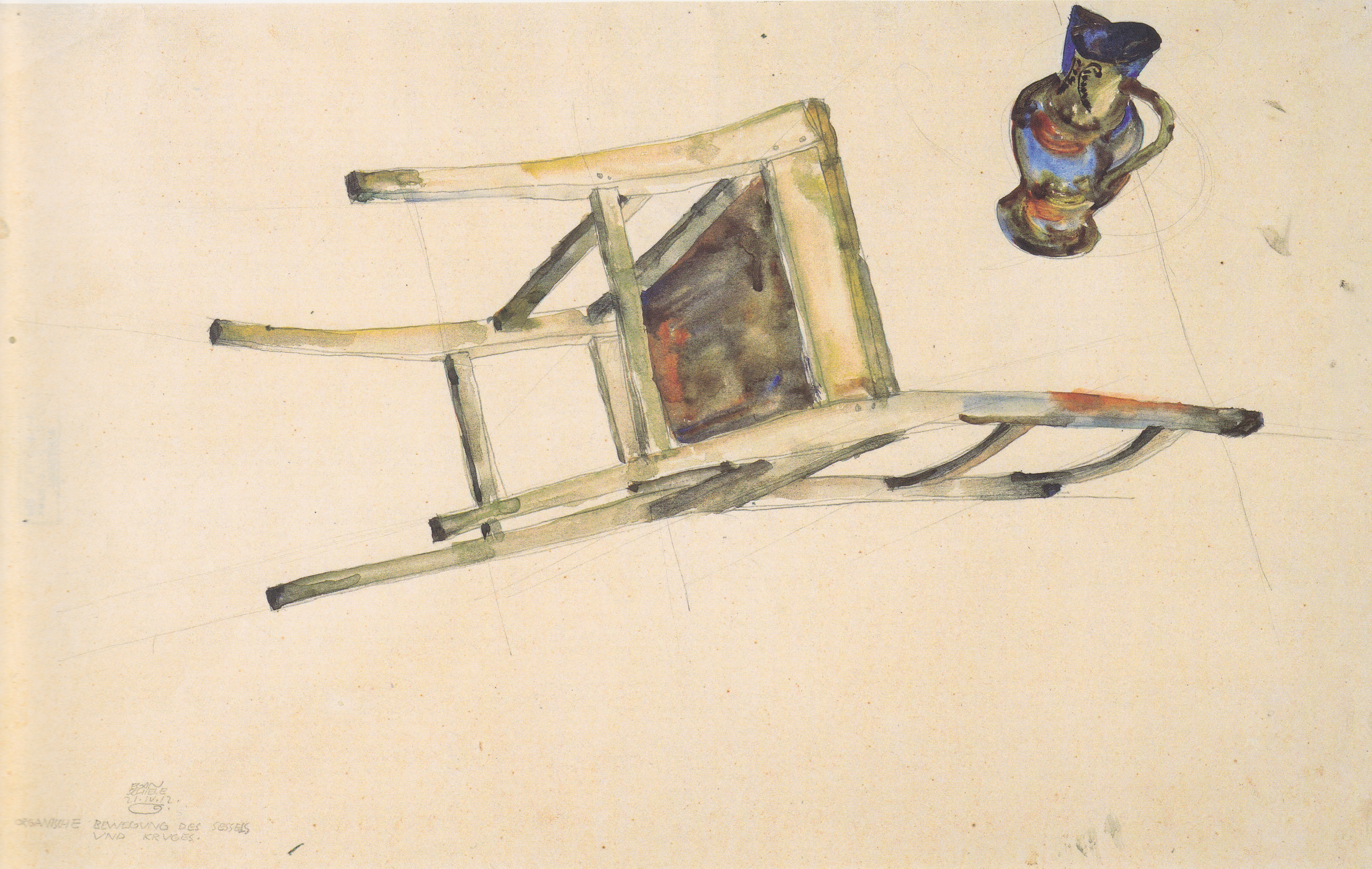
Egon Schiele's Organic Movement of a Chair and Jug inspired Suryodarmo's The Black Ball.

Suryodarmo devised the 2005 piece The Black Ball for a retrospective on painter Egon Schiele. Inspired by Schiele's 1912 drawing Organic Movement of a Chair and Jug, she held a black ball while sitting silently on a chair fixed to the museum's wall, high above the floor. During the first four days of the performance, she sat in the chair for eight-hour stretches.

=== I Love You ===
Suryodarmo's 2007 piece I Love You was first performed in Barcelona. For the piece, she carries a 70-pound pane of glass, and repeats the words "I love you" for four hours. She has performed I Love You in England, Sweden, and Malaysia.

=== I Am a Ghost in My Own House ===
In her 2012 work I Am a Ghost in My Own House, she explores consciousness related to family. In the piece, Suryodarmo silently crushes and grinds charcoal briquettes for 12 hours. The work premiered as a solo exhibition at Bandung's Lawangwangi Creative Space. By destroying a substance capable of creating energy (charcoal), Suryodarmo communicates a sense of loss.

=== The Acts of Indecency ===
In 2012, Suryodarmo created a photographic series influenced by Egon Schiele called The Acts of Indecency in 2012. In the work, she exposes her legs and is dressed in a tutu, wearing torn stockings stuffed with either ping pong balls or nails.

=== Dialogue With My Sleepless Tyrant ===
In Suryodarmo's two-hour 2013 work Dialogue With My Sleepless Tyrant, she lies down, sandwiched in the middle of tower of mattresses. Only her head is visible, sticking out from the 18-mattress stack, and her hair hangs down the side. Inspiration for the performance piece came from the fairy tale "The Princess and the Pea".

=== Transaction of Hollows ===
In her piece Transaction of Hollows, Suryodarmo shoots arrows at gallery walls using a Javanese bow. In one performance, she shot 800 arrows until her fingers began bleeding.

== Exhibitions and residencies ==
- 2006: Grace Exhibition Space, New York
- 2006: Loneliness in the Boundaries, a solo exhibition at Cemeti Art House
- 2007: "Artist in Studio 2007" at Lilith Performance Studio, Sweden
- 2009: "Workshop at the Academy of Fine Arts" at Umeå University, Sweden
- 2010: "IASPIS Residency" in Umeå and Saxnäs, Sweden
- 2011: residency at Manila Contemporary, Philippines
- 2012: residency at the Waremill Center, New York, USA
- 2014: APB Foundation Signature Art Prize, Singapore Art Museum, Singapore
- 2015: The 8th Asia Pacific Triennial of Contemporary Art (APT8), Queensland Art Gallery & Gallery of Modern Art, Queensland, Australia
- 2016: Singapore Biennale 2016: An Atlas of Mirror, Singapore Art Museum, Singapore
- 2017: SUNSHOWER: Contemporary Art from Southeast Asia 1980s to Now, National Art Centre Tokyo, Mori Art Museum, Tokyo, Japan
- 2018: TIMORIBUS, ShanghART Gallery, Singapore
- 2019: Contemporary Worlds: Indonesia, National Gallery of Australia, Canberra, Australia
- 2020: Why Let The Chicken Run?, Museum MACAN, Jakarta, Indonesia
- 2023: Ikon gallery in Birmingham PASSIONATE PILGRIM
- 2024: I am your Body: Chapter 2 - Flesh, Kunsthal Aarhus, Aarhus, Denmark

== Personal life ==
Suryodarmo married her first husband in Indonesia. In 1994, they moved to Braunschweig, Germany. She has a daughter named Selina and has lived in Groß Gleidingen, Germany. She is Buddhist.
