= Zhang Enli =

Chinese painter

- Born: Jilin, China

Chinese name
- Chinese: 張恩利
Transcriptions
Standard Mandarin
- Hanyu Pinyin: Zhāng ēn lì
- Wade–Giles: Zhang^{1} En^{1}Li^{4}
Yue: Cantonese
- Yale Romanization: zoeng1 jan1 lei6

Zhang Enli (simplified Chinese: 张恩利; traditional Chinese: 張恩利) was born 1965 in Jilin Province, China, is a professional artist living and working in Shanghai. He graduated from the Arts & Design Institute of Wuxi Technical University, China in 1989, and teaches at the Arts and Design Institute of Donghua University.

His paintings depict the familiar and overlooked, everyday objects connected through the artist's immediate surroundings, often from unusual viewpoints or focusing on seemingly insignificant details. He produces works that invite universal interpretation. He often works in series, such as his paintings that focus on the idea of the container—cardboard boxes, ashtrays, tin chests and lavatories. Other works depict functional municipal structures that populate the streets of Shanghai, such as public toilets and tiled outdoor water features. He is represented by Xavier Hufkens gallery, Hauser & Wirth and ShanghART Gallery.

== Exhibitions ==
His work was included in group exhibitions such as "Infinite Painting and Global Realism", curated by Francesco Bonami and Sarah Cosulich Canarutto, at Villa Manin Centro d'Arte Contemporanea, Udine (2006), "Dreaming of the Dragon's Nation: Contemporary Art from China', at the Irish Museum of Modern Art, Dublin (2005) and "Human, Too Human" at BizArt, Shanghai ( 2004 ). Zhang Enli gained attention at Art Basel, 2006, when he was one of the most successful of the contemporary Chinese artists whose work was on sale.
