= Ding Yi (artist) =

Chinese contemporary artist

- Born: Ding Rong; Shanghai, China
- Education: Shanghai University
- Known for: Chinese Abstraction

Chinese name
- Chinese: 丁㇠
Transcriptions
Standard Mandarin
- Hanyu Pinyin: Dīng Yǐ

Ding Yi (Chinese: 丁㇠; born 1962) is a Chinese contemporary artist currently based in Shanghai. A leading figure in Chinese contemporary art, Ding Yi works across painting, sculpture, installation, and architecture. Since the late 1980s, his signature motif—the cross “+” and its variant “x”—has served as a symbol of structure, rationality, and a visual language exploring the essence of being.

== Early life ==
Trained in both art and design, Ding Yi began experimenting with abstraction in 1982. During his student years, he developed a strong conviction about how to paint and what kind of artist he would become. Rejecting the Expressionism and Surrealism then prevalent in China, he chose a rational path “free from ideology.” Profoundly influenced by Western artists such as Piet Mondrian and Frank Stella during the 1985 “New Wave” art movement, Ding Yi launched his iconic Appearance of Crosses series in 1988, with a vision to create “an ultimate impression of abstraction”. At the time, he “designed” paintings that resembled plans for fabrics or blankets, using rulers and tape to eliminate traces of hand gestures —rigorously precise compositions formed through the repetition of the cross.

== Career ==
Ding Yi's enduring method of incorporating crosses into his work emerged in the late 1980s. He executed a series of painting experiments called Appearance of Crosses, in which the artist adopted the shapes of x and + as a recurring motif with the intention of combining painting and design into a single form of expression. The cross, whether a + or an x, is a motif that the artist has declared as a formal mark without meaning, while the context of this work is the industrial-paced development of the urban environment in post-socialist China. His perennial idiom —-- the grid —-- speaks to a context in place and time, through its association with the frenetic communications networks and distinctive fluorescence of the contemporary city.

== Style ==
The majority of his work features repetitions of the sign superimposed in different layers, colors, and rotations; the tiny, manually painted symbols cover the entire surface of large canvases, requiring a painstaking amount of precision and technical skill. By applying extremely rational design elements, Ding sought to "make painting that was not like painting," and for the past thirty years he has exclusively and relentlessly executed abstract paintings with shapes of small cross. The majority of his work features repetitions of the plus sign superimposed in different layers, colors, and rotations; the tiny, manually painted symbols cover the entire surface of large canvases, requiring a painstaking amount of precision and technical skill.

== Institutional solo exhibitions ==
- 2026 Cosmotechnics: Ding Yi as a Planetary Code, Fondazione Querini Stampalia, Venice, Italy
- 2025 Ding Yi: Between Prediction and Retrospection, Mostyn, Llandudno, Wales, UK
- 2025 Ding Yi: The Winding Path, Contemporary Gallery Kunming & Anthropology Museum of Yunnan University, Yunnan, China
- 2024 Ding Yi: Prediction and Retrospection, Château La Côste, Le Puy-Sainte-Réparade, France
- 2024 Crisscrosses: Ding Yi’s Public Art for Twenty Years Minghua Sugar Factory, Yangpu Waterfront, Shanghai, China
- 2023 Ding Yi: Homeland and Journey, Ningbo Museum of Art & Huamao Museum of Art Education, Ningbo, China
- 2023 Ding Yi: Cross Galaxy, Shenzhen Museum of Contemporary Art and Urban Planning，Shenzhen, China
- 2023 Dimension of “Crosses”, Mojie Art Museum, Taiyuan, Shanxi, China
- 2022 Ding Yi: Flowing Infinity, TAG Art Museum, Qingdao, Shandong, China
- 2022 Multi-verse:Ding Yi in Tibet, Jebum-gang Art Center & Shide space, Lhasa, China
- 2021 The Dream of Permanence, West Bund Art & Design Fair, Shanghai
- 2020 Ding Yi: The Cross-Style, Long Museum, Chongqing, China
- 2018 十×30 Years — Ding Yi's Works, Guangdong Museum of Art, Guangzhou
- 2017 Appearance of Crosses: A Chronicle, Xi'an Art Museum, Xi'an
- 2017 Appearance of Crosses, Sean Scully Studio, London, UK
- 2016 Ding Yi-Art Unlimited, Art Basel 2016, Booth Nr. U54, Basel, Switzerland
- 2016 Re-Appearance of Crosses, Ding Yi Solo Show, Hubei Museum of Art, Wuhan, Hubei
- 2015 Ding Yi: What's Left to Appear, Long Museum (West Bund), Shanghai
- 2013 2013 Art Changsha, Changsha City Museum, Hunan Province
- 2011 Specific Abstracted, Ding Yi Solo Exhibition, Minsheng Art Museum, Shanghai
- 2008 Appearance of Crosses from 1989 to 2007, Solo Exhibition of Ding Yi, Museo d'Arte Moderna di Bologna, Bologna, Italy
- 2005 Appearance of Crosses, Ikon Gallery, Birmingham, U.K.
- 2004 Crossed Vision, Works by Ding Yi, China Art Archive & Warehouse, Beijing, China
- 2000 Ding Yi: Fluorescent Paint on Tartan, China Art Archive & Warehouse, Beijing, China
- 1998 Ding Yi: Crosses'89 -'98, International Art Palace, Beijing, China
- 1997 Ding Yi: Crosses'97, Shanghai Art Museum, Shanghai, China
- 1994 Exhibition of Ding Yi's Abstract Art Works, Shanghai Art Museum, Shanghai, China
- 1994 Ding Yis Work on Paper, Guangzhou Fine Art Academy, Guangzhou, China

== Museum collections ==
His works are included in the collections of:

- University of Sydney Art Collection, Australia
- CDU Art Collection, Australia
- Stichting Van Tuyckom Foundation, Brussels, Belgium
- Chinese Modern Art Foundation, Ghent, Belgium
- Centre Pompidou, Paris, France
- DSL Collection, Paris, France
- Mercedes-Benz Art Collection, Berlin, Germany
- The City of Hamburg Germany, Hamburg, Germany
- Yuz Foundation, Jakarta, Indonesia
- Fukuoka Asian Art Museum, Fukuoka, Japan
- Morioka City Library, Morioka, Japan
- Leeum, Samsung Museum of Art, Seoul, Korea
- Sonje Museum of Contemporary Art, Gyeongju, Korea
- The British Museum, London, UK
- Ashmolean Museum, Oxford, UK
- Fosun Foundation, New York, USA
- The Metropolitan Museum of Art, New York, USA
- UBS Art Collection, Zurich, Switzerland
- Taikang Collection, Beijing, China
- The National Art Museum of China, Beijing, China
- Tsinghua University Art Museum, Beijing, China
- A4 Art Museum, Chengdu, China
- Chengdu Museum of Contemporary Art, Chengdu, China
- Museum of Sichuan Fine Arts Institute, Chongqing, China
- Guangdong Museum of Art, Guangzhou, China
- By Art Matters, Hangzhou, China
- K11 Art Foundation, Hong Kong, China
- M+ Collection, Hong Kong, China
- Jebum-gang Art Center, Lhasa, China
- Sifang Art Museum, Nanjing, China
- Huamao Museum of Art Education, Ningbo, China
- Ningbo Museum of Art, Ningbo, China
- Tag Art Museum, Qingdao, China
- ASE Foundation, Shanghai, China
- China Art Museum (former Shanghai Art Museum), Shanghai, China
- Long Museum, Shanghai, China
- MOCA Shanghai, China
- Powerlong Art Museum, Shanghai, China
- Power Station of Art, Shanghai, China
- Shanghai Bund Art Center, Shanghai, China
- Star Museum, Shanghai, China
- Tank Shanghai, China
- Z-art Center, Shanghai, China
- Shenzhen Museum of Contemporary Art and Urban Planning, Shenzhen, China
- He Art Museum, Shunde, China
- Hubei Museum of Art, Wuhan, China
- Xi'an Art Museum, Xi'an, China
- Yitiao Art Foundation, Hangzhou, China
