= Long Museum =

Private art museum in Shanghai, China

- Location: Shanghai
- Public transit access: Middle Longhua Road 7
- Website: www.thelongmuseum.org/en/

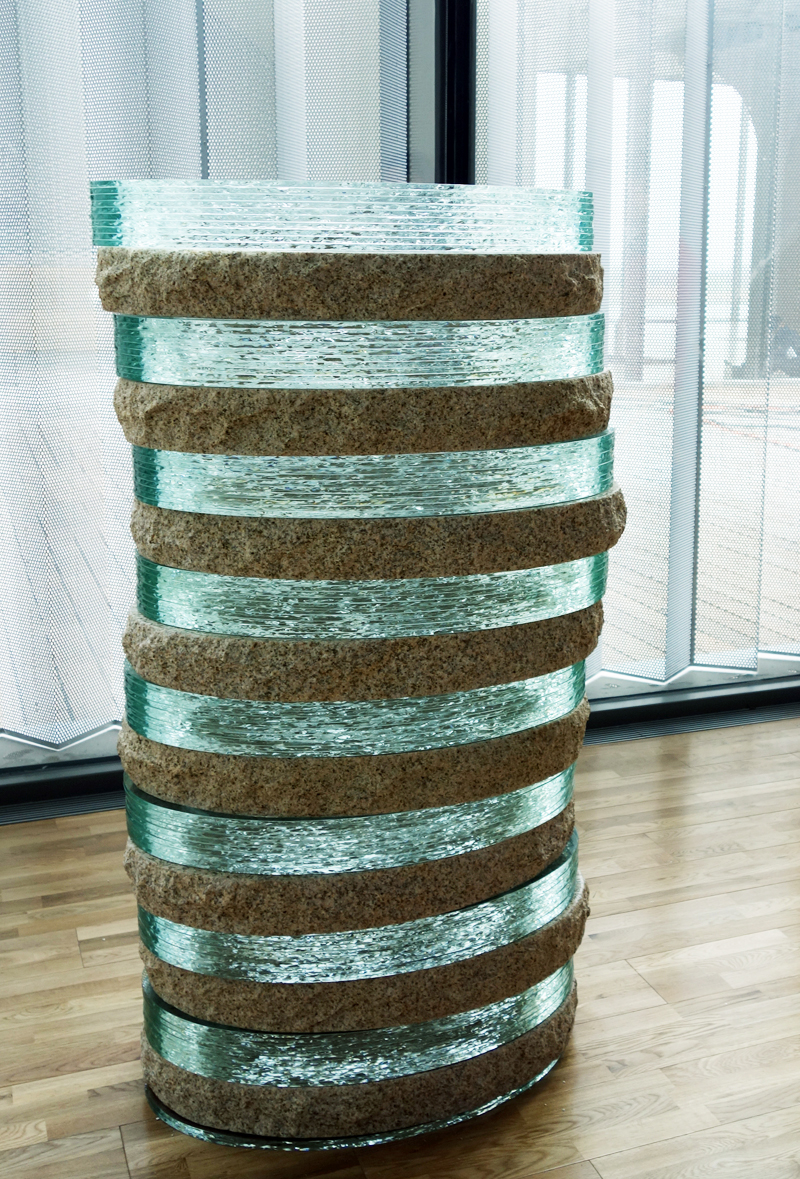
'CONTINUOUS' 2012 by Bert van Loo (Long Museum West Bund)

The Long Museum (Chinese: 龙美术馆; lit. 'Dragon Art Museum') is a private art museum in Shanghai, China, founded by Liu Yiqian and his wife Wang Wei. The museum has two locations in Shanghai: the Long Museum Pudong and Long Museum West Bund.

In 2016, a third location was opened in Chongqing and a Wuhan branch was scheduled for 2018.

== History ==
The Long Museum Pudong was officially opened to the public on December 18, 2012. The Long Museum West Bund opened on March 28, 2014, and was China's largest private museum at the time of its opening. It is the second of Chinese billionaire collectors Liu Yiqian and Wang Wei's. The architecture was designed by Liu Yichun of Atelier Deshaus.

== See also ==
- West Bund
- 50 Moganshan Road
- China Art Museum
- Museum of Contemporary Art Shanghai
- Shanghai Museum
- Tianzifang
- Xintiandi
- 798 Art Zone
