= Zhou Tiehai =

Chinese contemporary artist

Zhou Tiehai (Chinese: 周铁海; born 1966) is a contemporary Chinese artist. Trained as a painter in his native Shanghai, Zhou co-founded Shanghai's first international art fair, SH Contemporary, in 2007, assumed the directorship of the Minsheng Art Museum in 2010, and founded West Bund Art & Design in 2014.

== Artistic career ==
Zhou's art work often attempts to satirize much of modern Chinese art. He does not paint his own works, though he earned a M.F.A. from the School of Fine Arts at Shanghai University in 1989. He was quick to perceive the subtle colonialism that undergirded the Chinese art world of the early 1990s.

Zhou takes on the role of both artist and patron, as many of his airbrush paintings are rendered by assistants under his supervision. A typical process for Zhou Tiehai is to conceptualize a work, realize it on the computer, then rely upon the help of assistants to physically create it. He is mostly known for appropriation art, in particular, appropriating the Camel advertising character that he calls Joe Camel (playing on his family name "Zhou") and making large paintings that reference famous western motifs from art history.

Even though Zhou's work is exhibited widely in China and abroad, he does not produce any new work. Zhou has exhibited in the M+ Museum, Hong Kong (2021), the Solomon R. Guggenheim Museum, New York (2017), the Shanghai Art Museum, China (2006), the Tate Liverpool, U.K. (2007), the Whitney Museum, New York (2003), the Centre Pompidou, Paris (2003), MOMA PS1, New York (1998), as well as the 5th Shanghai Biennale (2004), the 4th Gwangju Biennial, (2002), and the 48th Venice Biennale (1999).

== Museum Director ==
In 2009, Zhou was appointed Director of the Minsheng Art Museum in Shanghai.

== West Bund Art & Design ==
In 2014, Zhou founded West Bund Art & Design and serve as Artistic Director. For Zhou, the continuously uncertain and evolving status of art in Shanghai—conveyed by the provisional material nature of this collage—is rich with possibility.
