= Rockbund Art Museum =

Art museum in Shanghai, China

Coordinates: 31.2430°N 121.4843°E

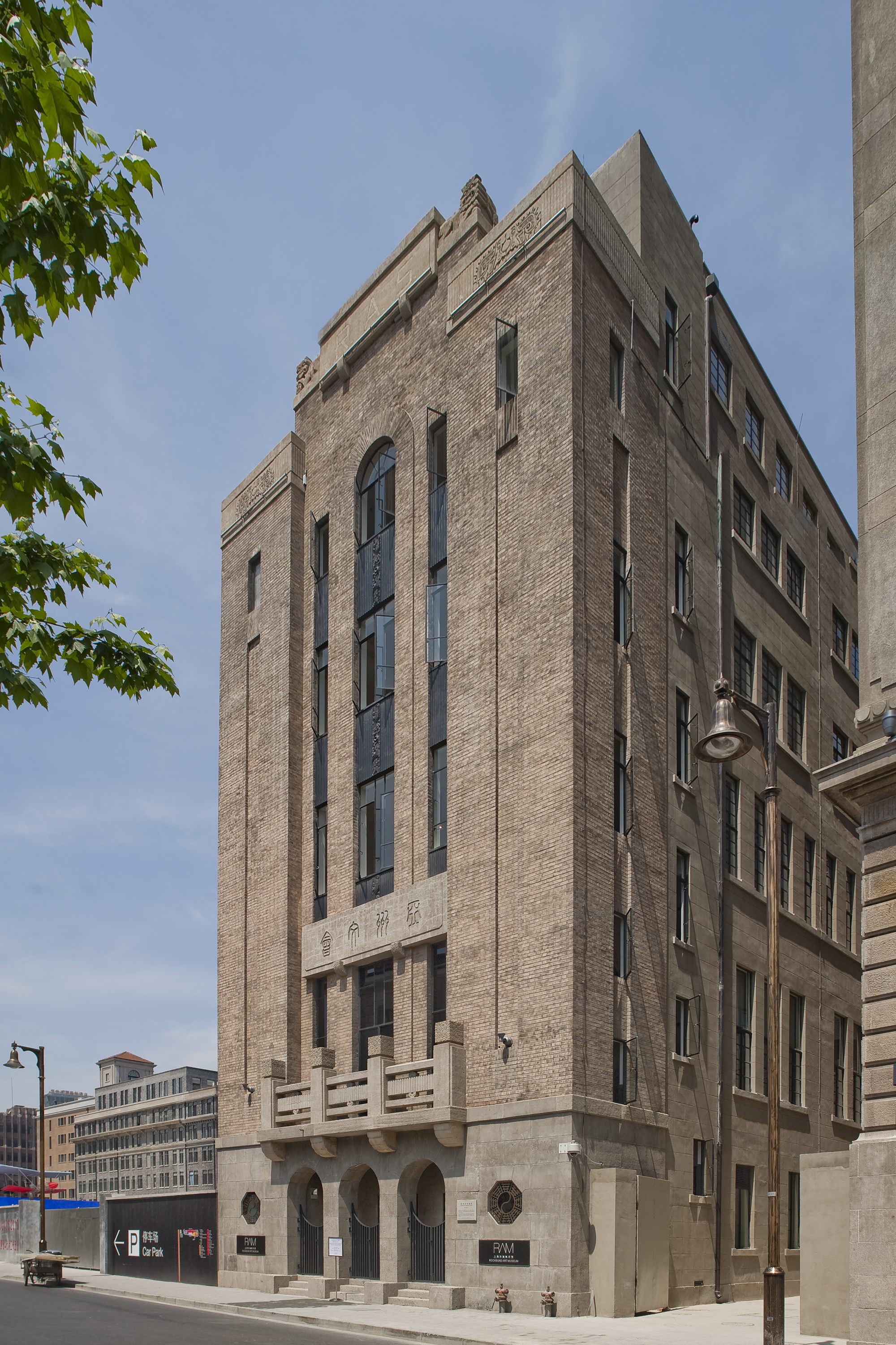
The Rockbund Art Museum

The Rockbund Art Museum (RAM, simplified Chinese: 上海外滩美术馆; traditional Chinese: 上海外灘美術館; pinyin: Shànghǎi Wàitān Měishùguǎn; lit. 'Shanghai Bund Art Museum') is a contemporary art museum in central Shanghai. The museum is on Huqiu Road, in the former Royal Asiatic Society building completed in 1933 near The Bund waterfront. There are no permanent collections. Featured Chinese artists have included Cai Guo-Qiang and Zeng Fanzhi.

== History ==
Rockbund Art Museum is located in the peninsular headland where Suzhou Creek flows into the Huangpu River, in an area now marketed as the "Source of the Bund" (Waitanyuan). The museum is housed in the former Royal Asiatic Society (RAS) building, which was also home to one of China's first modern museums, the previous Shanghai Museum. Adjacent to the Former Consulate-General of the United Kingdom, Shanghai, this neighborhood was one of the first settlements of foreign expatriates, and a centre of cultural and commercial prosperity.

Started in 1932, the Art Deco RAS building was part of the history of 19th and 20th century Sino-European cultural and academic exchange. At its height, this five-story building, which contained a lecture hall, a library, and a museum, received over 7,000 visits a month. Bringing together the functions of scholarly research, cultural exchange and public education under one roof, this structure was unique in Shanghai at the time.

During the half-century of its existence, the RAS Shanghai Museum had established collaborative relationships with museums internationally, including the British Museum, the New York Metropolitan Museum of Art, and the Musée Guimet in France. Through its programmes, it contributed to scholarship in related disciplines, cultural exchanges between China and the rest of the world, and the dissemination of scientific knowledge in the community. Eventually it had become the largest center for Oriental Studies as well as an institution for public education.

In 1952, RAS closed its operation in China. At its request, its collections were transferred to the new Shanghai Municipal Services, which included 20,328 natural specimens, 6,663 historical artifacts and over 14,000 books and documents. They were then reallocated to Shanghai Natural History Museum, the new Shanghai Museum and the Bibliotheca Zi-Ka-Wei (the Xujiahui Library, a special collection of the Shanghai Library), forming the core collection of the three institutions respectively.

== Building ==
In 2005, the Shanghai Bund de Rockefeller Group Master Development Co. Ltd. obtained the right to develop the area. With consideration for its historical and cultural heritage, and as a form of contribution to the community, the developer decided to restore the RAS building, and to renovate it into a public museum for contemporary art.

The British architect David Chipperfield, who had previously directed the planning of the Museum Island in Berlin, was In charge of the task of restoration and design planning of the building in 2007, maintaining a minimalist style. The building was originally designed by the British design firm Palmer and Turner. In highlighting a blend of Western architectural elements with Shanghai's cityscape, the firm incorporated traditional Chinese decorative elements in the building and created a unique hybrid architectural style. In an effort to retain the original flavour of the historical building, David Chipperfield chose to stay consistent to the original 1932 design in the building's main exterior facade in the restoration.

To facilitate the functions of a modern art museum, the restoration, extended the building eastward, creating an open plaza on the ground floor, and a rooftop outdoor terrace on the eastern façade, the new parts echoing the old. At the same time, to meet the periodic changes necessary for modern art exhibitions, the designer made modifications to the existing space. The biggest renovation is in the skylight design that connects the upper three floors. For the interior colour scheme, the building's original precedent was followed, with light colours in the exhibition spaces with black steel and wooden furniture, providing a clean backdrop for exhibitions.

== Transport ==
The nearest Metro station is East Nanjing Road Station on Shanghai Metro Line 2 and Line 10.

== Exhibitions ==
- 2010: Zeng Fanzhi.
- 2014: Bharti Kher: Misdemeanours.
- 2014: Ugo Rondinone: Breathe Walk Die.
- January 21, 2017 – June 4, 2017: Song Dong: I Don’t Know the Mandate of Heaven
- July 8, 2017 – September 17, 2017: Philippe Parreno: Synchronicity.
- September 29, 2017 – October 4, 2017: RAM HIGHLIGHT: DISPLACE
- October 2017 – February 2018: Hugo Boss Asia Art 2017
