= Zeng Fanzhi =

Chinese contemporary artist

- 曾梵志
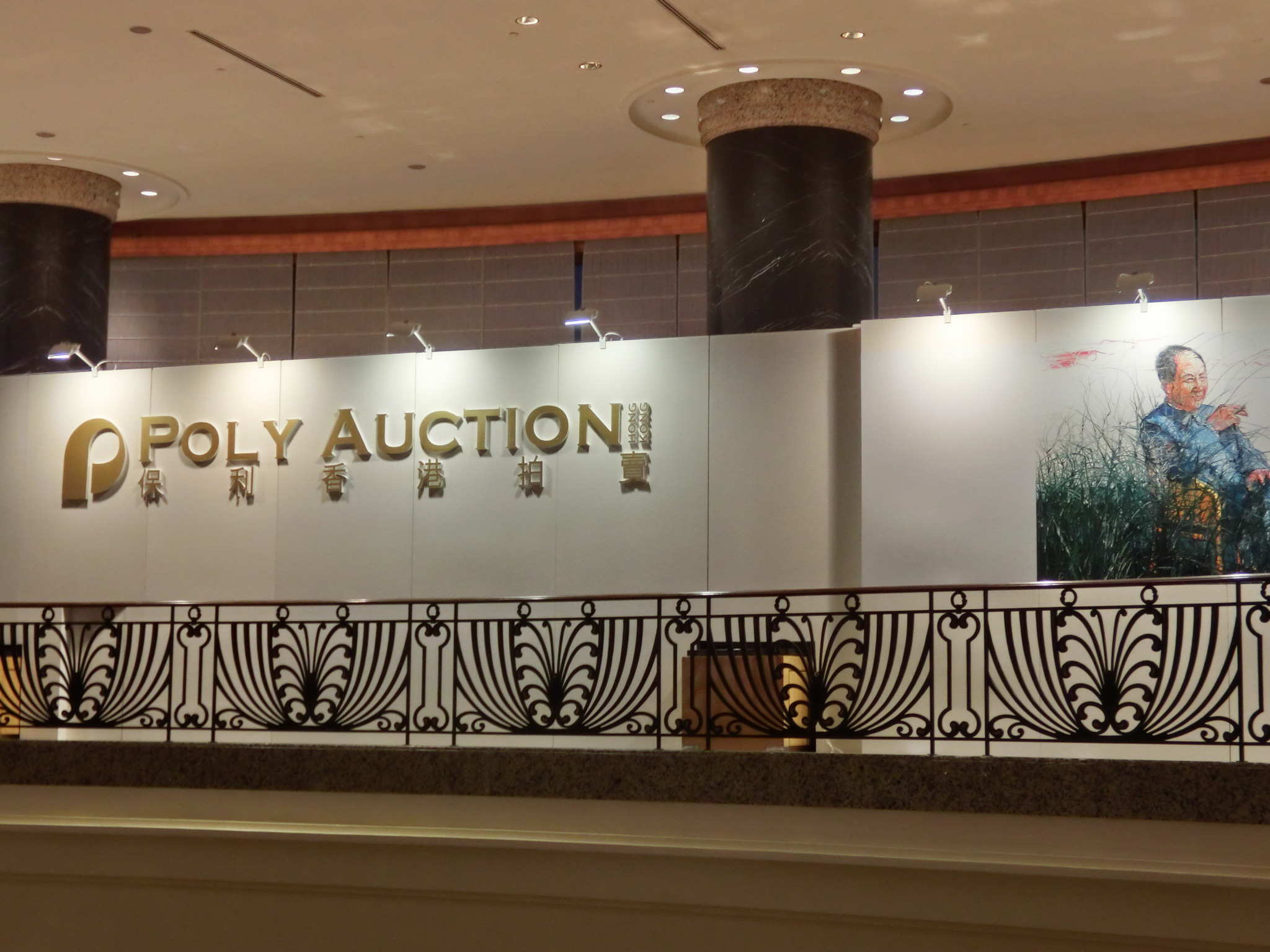
- Zeng Fanzhi's artwork auction Mao's Song Poem of Snow, No.2
- Known for: Painting, sculpture
- Notable work: Hospital Triptych series; Mask series; The Last Supper (2001); Abstract Landscape series
- Movement: Cynical Realism, Expressionism

Zeng Fanzhi (Chinese: 曾梵志; pinyin: Zēng Fànzhì; born 1964) is a contemporary Chinese artist based in Beijing. Zeng's works have been praised as possessing an emotional directness, an intuitive psychological sense, and a carefully calibrated expressionistic technique.

Born and raised in Wuhan, Zeng was interested primarily in painting and drawing from a young age, and did poorly in school. His earliest works are large-scale abstract paintings. Moving to Beijing in the early 1990s, Zeng's art became a response to this immersion in what he viewed as a more superficial environment, with his seminal Mask series displaying the tensions between the artist's dominant existential concerns and the pomposity and posturing of his new contemporary urban life (which is depicted ironically).

Throughout, Zeng's expressionistic techniques run counter to conventional expressionism. His representation of raw, exposed flesh or awkwardly oversized hands is not an attempt at pure emotional expression, but instead plays against the superficially composed appearances of his subjects, an ironic treatment of emotional performance as a metaphor for a lost self and stunted self-realization.

Popular mostly with foreign collectors at first, Chinese buyers of Zeng's work rose in the mid-2000s. He has been described as an "icon of the art world", and is often considered China's greatest living artist.

== Early life ==
Zeng was born in 1964 in Wuhan, Hubei. He grew up during the Cultural Revolution and dropped out of high school. He later attended Hubei Institute of Fine Arts (HIFA), where he was influenced by Expressionism. Zeng became one of the most popular artists of his era, in addition to being one of the most financially successful in Asia. In May 2008, he set a world auction record when "Mask Series 1996 No. 6", one of his contemporary Chinese art pieces, was sold for $9.7 million in Hong Kong. The same piece had been sold to an American tourist for $16,000 in 1998. Zeng has lived and worked in Beijing since 1993 and has been exhibited in venues such as the Shanghai Art Museum, National Art Museum of China, Kunst Museum Bonn, Kunstmuseum Bern, Santa Monica Art Centre, Art Centre, and Le Musée d'Art moderne de la Ville de Paris.

== Art school ==
Zeng was in Hubei Institute of Fine Arts from 1987 to 1991, and paid a particular interest in German expressionist painters. During his third year of schooling, he began instead to learn more about the actual approaches that the expressionists would take to painting. By the time his first show came to fruition, it was apparent that he had gained his very own style and the work gained him a large amount of respect in the Chinese art scene.

== Artistic progression ==
Romantic paintings, Paul Cézanne, Pablo Picasso, pop art and Chinese traditional painting have all influenced Zeng's art at different times in his career, but his work is most heavily influenced by his physical and emotional circumstances. His Hospital series, inspired by the scenes he witnessed in the local clinic near where he lived, is considered among his major early achievements, as well as the "meat" series. Both series are influenced by German Expressionism, unlike the landscapes and portraits generally done by his classmates. In his Hospital series, Zeng moved to a theme that included the use of hospital interiors, where he devoted much of the detail to the patients' moods and the power that certain brush stroking techniques could yield. These paintings often hinted at a sadomasochistic relationship in the world with his pale colors and blood colored flesh of the patients. In using these techniques, he shows a somewhat pessimistic view of the world. His expressionist technique shined through in these works further with an extreme expression in the eyes of the characters. Also, the hands of the patients are notably oversized and the joints are much larger as well. The scenes he depicts seem to show patients caught up in seeming hysteria, and the deep red colors show anger of sorts.

After 1994, Zeng's work shifted toward his Mask series in which his style takes a drastic shift that is considered the second period in his work. Instead of the anger and brutal nature of the hospital series, the Mask series is more apathetic. The scenes are painted from a distance, and have a mask of some sort as the center of focus. The groups are often small or include a single person, and that seems to show that Zeng is touching on personal relationships and the fact that society is filled with false relationships. By using a mask, even if a person is with a group, there is a sense of solitude for the person wearing the mask. He also explores new techniques that include using a palette knife as a paintbrush. This causes the characters to have an even more blurred edge to them, which essentially masks the painting as a whole. The lighting on the paintings are not coming from an obvious source, and the characters seem to be separated from the world around them through an awkward placement in the background. Through the different techniques, the characters seem much more calm than his earlier hospital series. The figures' hands are in fists and also much more realistic and apparent than in the past, and this causes them to seem as though they are controlling an emotion instead of venting anger, etc. The Mask series received wide acclaim from critics and made him a multimillion dollar artist.

After 1997, Zeng's art became more stylish through the incorporation of new backgrounds like the sea. He uses softer colors that are more blended into each other and this makes for a more comfortable viewing experience. Rather than anger or a controlled emotion, these figures are more relaxed and their hands are sometimes in their pockets. This seems to show that the artist's mood at the time is also more relaxed. What was once angry and bold has become more calm through different brush strokes, but there is still a sort of anxiety that can be noted by the fact that the characters have larger-than-normal heads. Rather than his expressionist beginnings, his work now seems to consist largely of symbolism. His Mask series ended in 2004, and subsequent works show his study of traditional Chinese landscapes and calligraphy.

Paintings that have been described as representative include the Meat series and Hospital Triptychs; the Mask and Behind the Mask series; and the Landscapes series. For a 2014 show at the Louvre, he completed some large oil paintings with western figures, a series called From 1830 Till Now (and also known as The Louvre Project). These were followed by minimalist, black-and-white works etched on handmade paper and influenced by the art of the Song dynasty. Each painting by Zeng takes about a month for him to complete. He has also said, "My works have to originate from the depths of my heart."

Zeng has collaborated with the Japanese architect Tadao Ando in his exhibitions. He also supports a variety of educational and art initiatives through The Fanzhi Foundation for Art and Education, a non-profit foundation which he established to foster more exchanges and understanding of art. Zeng is represented by Hauser & Wirth.

== We n:2 ==
We n:2 is both an abstract and a self-portrait of Zeng Fanzhi. The fact that the face is so large and dominating causes the viewer to feel almost minuscule in its presence. He uses squiggle lines that create a screen that describes the impossibility of truly knowing someone. The marks that he makes over his face almost cause a "ghost image, echoing multiplicity and technological distortion."

== This Land Is So Rich in Beauty 2 ==
Considering the expressionist style of Zeng's work, the viewer seems to feel violent tension. His landscapes are some of his best work, and while painting them he uses two separate brushes. In doing so, one brush demonstrates the purpose of what he is painting, and the other is "leaving traces of his subconscious through processes." This causes his landscapes to not only have a real feel to them, but also an abstract sense of expression.

== Tiananmen ==
In an effort to describe the rocky past, Zeng places an abstract version of chairman Mao over the building in Tiananmen Square. The bright reds and oranges show both an ironic sense of great courage over the top of an uncertain future. The painting is given animation with a flurry of brush strokes that replace what would normally be depicted as stoic and strait-laced. The fact that chairman Mao's portrait dominates the painting is possibly a symbol for his dominance over Chinese culture.

== Art market ==
In May 2008, Christie's Hong Kong pioneered the Asian Contemporary Art Evening sale. His work Mask Series No. 6 was sold for HK$75,367,500. Christie's Hong Kong set a world auction record for the artist in 2008.

In October 2013, Sotheby's Hong Kong at the Asian Contemporary 40th Anniversary Sale, The Last Supper (2001) was sold for HK$180.4 million (US$23.3) million, setting a new record for contemporary Asian artwork.

Paradise (2014), a painting done by Zeng and businessman Jack Ma to raise money for an environmental campaign group, was sold for HK$42.2 million (US$5.4 million) in 2015.

As of 2017, Zeng's total sales volume surpassed $444 million. In August 2020, Mask Series 1996 No. 6 was sold for 161 million yuan ($23.3 million) in Beijing.

== Reception ==
Zeng's work has garnered acclaim from art scholars. Amy Qin described his thicket-filled abstract landscapes as "haunting". Darryl Wee wrote that the 2011 exhibition of works by Zeng at the Gagosian Gallery's Hong Kong branch was the highlight, referring to Man and Meat (1993) as "a disquieting allegory of frenzied, winner-take-all capitalism in contemporary China."

In China Daily, Lin Qi reported that after the 2014 Louvre show, "Visitors were asked to comment on Zeng's work. Some were fascinated by his bold treatment. Others didn't think it fit the room."

Nick Simunovic, director of the Hong Kong branch of the Gagosian Gallery (which represents Zeng outside China), stated, "We consider Fanzhi to be the greatest living artist in China, in part because his visual imagery has changed over and over again [...] He's never satisfied with a single identity and in many respects he's getting better and better; his art really maps the development of China."

== Exhibitions ==
In 2011, 18 selections from his works since 1991 were presented at Gagosian Gallery's Hong Kong location. From 18 October 2013 to 16 February 2014, there was a retrospective of 40 of his paintings and sculptures at the Musée d'Art Moderne de Paris, the first French retrospective. From 1830 Till Now No 4 appeared in the Louvre's Room 77 from October 22 to November 17, 2014. In a ShanghART show, all four works in From 1830 Till Now were displayed.

The first Beijing exhibition of works by Zeng was "Parcours", at the Ullens Center for Contemporary Art from 19 September to 19 November 2016, including nearly sixty works. There were three 2018 exhibitions at Hauser & Wirth galleries in Zürich, London, and Hong Kong. These shows, called "Zeng Fanzhi: In the Studio", were about his abstract paintings, his portraits, and the similarities between his Western-influenced and Eastern-influenced works, respectively.
