= Jérôme Sans =

French art critic & curator (born 1960)

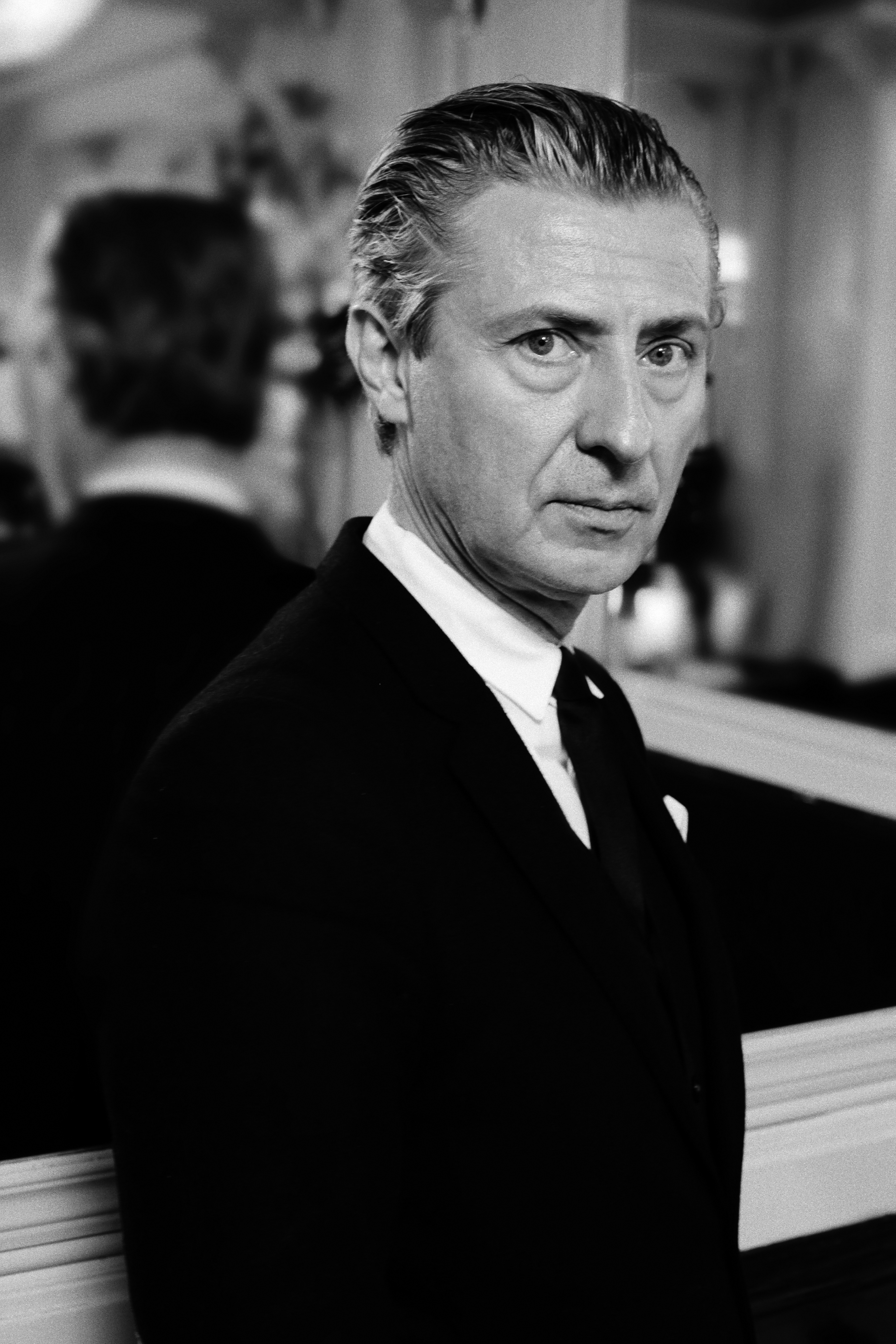
Jérôme Sans

Jérôme Sans (born 1960) is a French artistic director, director of contemporary art institutions, art critic, and curator. He is based in Paris.

== Biography ==
Jérôme Sans (born 2 August 1960, Paris) is a French curator, art critic, and artistic director.

From 1999 to 2006, he served as co-founder and co-director of the Palais de Tokyo in Paris alongside Nicolas Bourriaud. He has worked as an artistic director, curator, and art critic, developing contemporary art projects in France and internationally, both independently and in collaboration with others.

In the 1990s, he was a guest curator at Magasin 3 Stockholm Konsthall in Sweden in 1994 and 1996, and at the Institute of Visual Arts in Milwaukee, United States, from 1996 to 2003. He served as artistic director of two editions of the Printemps de Cahors: One Minute Scenario in 1997, which featured artists including Dennis Hopper, Doug Aitken, Thomas Demand, Pierre Huyghe, Valérie Jouve, Ken Lum, and Jack Pierson, and La sphère de l’intime in 1998. From 1998 to 1999, he was a visiting professor at Central Saint Martins College of Art and Design in London.

Sans has founded, directed, and curated a number of cultural institutions. From 2008 to 2012, he was director of the Ullens Center for Contemporary Art (UCCA) in Beijing, and has since remained a member of its board of directors. From 2006 to 2013, he served as Global Curator for Le Méridien Hotels & Resorts. In 2012, he founded L’Officiel Art magazine, serving as creative director and editor-in-chief until 2014. Between 2015 and 2017, he was co-artistic director of the Grand Paris Express cultural programme. From 2017 to 2020, he directed the artistic and cultural centre on the northern tip of Île Seguin, developed by the Emerige group. From 2010 to 2025, he served as artistic director of the urban redevelopment programme Rives de Saône – River Movie for the Lyon metropolitan area. Between 2022 and 2024, he contributed to the development of LagoAlgo, a hybrid cultural venue in Mexico City. He is currently involved in the creation of an art space in Denver, known as the Cookie Factory.

He has curated numerous exhibitions internationally, including the Taipei Biennial (2000), the Lyon Biennal (2005), Nuit Blanche (2006), and Li Qing at the Prada Rong Zhai Foundation in Shanghai (2019). Other projects include Pascale Marthine Tayou at the Clément Foundation in Martinique, Erwin Wurm at the Taipei Fine Arts Museum (2020) and the Museum of Contemporary Art in Belgrade (2022), and Au cours des mondes by Alicja Kwade at Place Vendôme in Paris (2023).

== Art Institutions ==
=== Institute of Visual Arts (INOVA), Milwaukee (1996–2003) ===
From 1996 to 2003, Sans served as adjunct curator of the University of Wisconsin-Milwaukke in Milwaukee, where he presented a series of solo exhibitions featuring new artists shown for the first time in a U.S. institution. These artists included Maurizio Cattelan, Pierre Huyghe, Erwin Wurm, Kendell Geers, Philippe Parreno, Barthélémy Toguo, Steve McQueen, Kimsooja, Joachim Koester, Annelies Strba, Lars Nilsson, and Annika von Hausswolff.

=== Palais de Tokyo, Paris (1999–2006) ===
From 1999 until 2006, Jérôme Sans was the co-founder and director of the Palais de Tokyo (Center for Contemporary Creation) in Paris, France, alongside Nicolas Bourriaud. This institution became one of the most important art centers in Europe, significantly contributing to the international visibility of many French artists.

At the Palais de Tokyo, he collaborated with architects Anne Lacaton and Jean-Philippe Vassal for the reopening of the venue, and with architect Stéphane Maupin for the restaurant. Sans developed new economic strategies for managing artistic projects, involving brands for the first time in such art institutions.

In six years, the Palais de Tokyo welcomed more than 1 million visitors. It was a pioneer in reconciling the City of Light with contemporary art and has served as a model for its programming, emulated well beyond the borders of France by specialists, art lovers, and the general public.

During this period, the Palais de Tokyo presented more than 80 solo exhibitions featuring artists such as Tobias Rehberger, Chen Zhen, Wolfgang Tillmans, Kendell Geers, Candice Breitz, Wang Du, Bruno Peinado, and Katharina Grosse. It also hosted 8 group exhibitions, including Translation, Hardcore, Live, GNS, and Notre histoire, as well as over one hundred events, concerts, and performances featuring artists like Laurent Garnier, Marina Abramović, Jan Fabre, and Christophe.

=== Baltic Centre for Contemporary Art, Gateshead (2006–2008) ===
From 2006 until 2008, Jérôme Sans served as the artistic director of the Baltic Centre for Contemporary Art in Gateshead, England, where he contributed to re-establishing the international center as one of the most creative venues in the UK. Housed in a former flour mill, the Baltic presents a constantly changing program of exhibitions and events. Jérôme Sans has curated numerous solo shows there, featuring artists such as Kendell Geers, Subodh Gupta, Brian Eno, Kader Attia, and British painter Beryl Cook.

=== Ullens Center for Contemporary Art, Beijing (2008–2012) ===
From 2008 to 2012, Sans served as the director of the groundbreaking Ullens Center for Contemporary Art in Beijing (UCCA), created by Belgian collector Guy Ullens as the first private art center in China. He established a new economic model for the center, transforming the UCCA into a reference point for Chinese and international contemporary art, with more than 67 exhibitions and 1,500 events over four years. Sans collaborated with architect Jean-Michel Wilmotte to redefine the structure of the center, adapting its Bauhaus style to create flexible exhibition spaces. He has also served as an ambassador for Chinese contemporary art, dedicated to building the local and international profile of the UCCA with a world-class program of exhibitions. Through his efforts, he actively promoted Chinese contemporary art globally by fostering a vigorous dialogue between local and international artists and audiences. Additionally, he helped bring a new economy to the art center by working with local and international partners. He is currently a member of the Advisory Board of the UCCA.

=== Le Méridien (2006–2013) ===
From 2006 to 2013, Jérôme Sans served as Global Cultural Curator for Le Méridien in the high-end hospitality industry.

By gathering a community (LM100) of interdisciplinary creators and ambassadors—artists, architects, chefs, filmmakers, photographers, and perfume designers, each recognized in their field for their innovation—Sans reinvented the company's vocabulary around the three words "Chic, Culture, and Discovery." This repositioned Le Méridien as a contemporary and unique hospitality group engaged in today's culture.

Sans transformed all areas of life and everyday gestures into "moments" dedicated to a set of sensual and creative experiences. This included developing the brand's olfactory identity, its original soundtrack, a signature breakfast menu, a creative wine list, and the in-situ creation of works of art in the hotels. He also introduced magnetic collector cards designed by artists, which not only provided room access but also offered guests free opportunities to discover curated creative cultural institutions in the cities where Le Méridien hotels are located worldwide.

=== Contemporary art venue led by Emerige, Ile Seguin, Boulogne, Paris (2017-2020) ===
Between 2017 and 2020, Jérôme Sans served as the artistic director for the prefiguration of the future contemporary art space of the Fondation Emerige on Île Seguin in Boulogne-Billancourt. Designed by the Catalan architects RCR Arquitectes, winners of the 2017 Pritzker Prize, this new artistic and cultural project, led by the Emerige group, includes a contemporary art venue, a multiplex cinema, and a hotel dedicated to contemporary creation.

=== Lago/Algo, Mexico City (2022-2024) ===
LagoAlgo is a private initiative that opened in February 2022. It is supported by CMR, the operator of the Del Lago restaurant, in partnership with OMR as the space's cultural arm, and ALGO, in collaboration with Jérôme Sans as the artistic director.

LagoAlgo is a hybrid initiative where art and culture are at the forefront of this adventure. It serves as an open platform for dialogue and exchange, aimed at exploring, questioning, and potentially reinventing the world—a world in which we are deeply connected to nature and concerned about our shared future and its sustainability. It is a place to live, where art and life are unified. LagoAlgo is not a fixed model; rather, it is in permanent flux. Like a snowball, it will mutate and change over time, regularly incorporating new usages, forms of projects, and various new actors or collaborations. By definition, LagoAlgo is a new space for living and sharing.

=== Cookie Factory, Denver (since 2024) ===
Jérôme Sans is the artistic director of Cookie Factory, a contemporary art space set to open in May 2025 in Denver. Housed in a repurposed 1950s fortune cookie factory, this 500-square-meter public art space is dedicated to fostering creativity and dialogue through a program of two exhibitions per year.

Located in the heart of Denver’s historic Baker neighborhood, Cookie Factory places the notions of home and community at the core of its philosophy by encouraging new cultural exchanges within this residential neighborhood. Committed to collaborating with internationally renowned artists, it seeks to create unique works inspired by the landscapes of Denver and Colorado at large.

== Urban Development ==
=== "River Movie", Rives de Saône (2010–2014) ===
From 2010 to 2014, Sans served as the artistic director for the 50 km reorganization of the Lyon docks along the Saône River, a major public art program in Europe.

More than ten international artists, including Tadashi Kawamata, Jean-Michel Othoniel, Didier Faustino, Lang-Baumann, Elmgreen & Dragset, Le Gentil Garçon, Erik Samakh, Pascale Marthine Tayou, and Meshac Gaba, created site-specific works that are permanently installed along the docks, contributing to the artistic identity of Lyon. The program was developed through a unique collaboration between architects, landscape architects, and artists.

=== Grand Paris Express (2015-2016) ===
From 2015 to 2017, Jérôme Sans served as the artistic co-director of the Grand Paris Express, alongside José-Manuel Gonçalvès, appointed by the Société du Grand Paris. This metropolitan "super underground" was designed to extend over 200 km, with stations created by various architects and designers. With an integrated approach to localities and territories, the artistic and cultural direction sought to support the transformation phase by collaborating with creators, designers, architects, and engineers already involved in the construction of the new underground, establishing a metropolitan artistic heritage.

=== Polygone Riviera, Cagnes-sur-Mer (2015–2019) ===
As the artistic director of an open-air shopping mall, Polygone Riviera in Cagnes-sur-Mer, France, Jerome Sans developed an art program featuring eleven works by world-renowned artists displayed in the center. The featured artists included Ben, including Ben, Céleste Boursier-Mougenot, Daniel Buren, César, Antony Gormley, Tim Noble & Sue Webster, Jean-Michel Othoniel, Pablo Reinoso, Pascale Marthine Tayou, and Wang Du.

During the summer of 2016, several works by Joan Miró were exhibited at the heart of the shopping mall, through a partnership with the nearby Maeght Foundation.

== Publications and Magazines ==
=== L'Officiel Art (2012–2013) ===
From 2012 to 2013, Jérôme Sans served as the creative director and editor-in-chief of the quarterly art magazine L'Officiel Art, published by Éditions Jalou in Paris. By joining Éditions Jalou to direct L’Officiel Art, he championed a new generation of art magazines in which art and artists narrate and engage with a world interwoven with fashion, style, and all contemporary creative expressions. ("If art is a way of life, L’Officiel Art is its magazine.") The magazine aimed to place artists at the center of this cross-cultural debate. Sans managed the first eight issues of the magazine, inviting eight artists to create special covers: Daniel Buren, Farhad Moshiri, Bertrand Lavier, Yan Pei-Ming, Sterling Ruby, Marina Abramovic & Terence Koh, Loris Gréaud, and Youssef Nabil.

== Exhibitions curated ==
Jérôme Sans has curated over 300 solo and group exhibitions worldwide, both in art institutions and outside them, including:

- New French Painting (1983), traveling exhibition in England (Riverside Studios, London; Modern Art Oxford; John Hansard Gallery, Southampton; Fruitmarket Gallery, Edinburgh)
- F. Four French (1986), (with Sophie Calle, Bernard Frize, IFP) Lang & O'Hara Gallery, New York
- Viennese Story (1992), Wiener Secession, Vienna (with Douglas Gordon, Rirkrit Tiravanija, Erwin Wurm, Chen Zhen, Eric Duyckaerts, Sam Samore, Wendy Jacob, Kendell Geers, Angela Bulloch, and Rainer Ganahl)
- Life style/International Kunst - Mode, Design, Styling Interieur und Werbung (1998), Bregenz Kunstmuseum (with John Armleder, Daniel Buetti, Dejanov/Heger, Sylvie Fleury, Peter Kogler, Pipilotti Rist, Gerwald Rockenshaub, Cindy Sherman, and Heimo Zobernig)
- Pierre Huyghe (1999), Fundaçao de Serralves, Porto
- The Snowball (1999) for the Danish Pavilion at the 48th Venice Biennale, where he invited the American artist Jason Rhoades and Danish Peter Bonde to work together (questioning for the first time in this international event, the nationality issue);
- Pierre Huyghe, The Process of Leisure Time (1999), Wiener Secession, Vienna;
- The Taipei Biennale, entitled The Sky Is The Limit (2000), Taipei Fine Art Museum (with Candice Breitz, Loris Cecchini, Claude Closky, Meschac Gaba, Kendell Geers, Hsia-Fei Chang, Shu Lee Chang, Pascale Marthine Tayou, Henrik Plenge Jakobsen, and Wang Du), developing this event to an international dimension
- My Home is Yours, Your home is mine (2001) co-curated with Hou Hanru at the Rodin Museum in Seoul, Korea & at the Tokyo City Opera Art gallery, Japan
- Voices Over, Arte All'arte (2001), co-curated with Pier Luigi Tazzi in several cities in Tuscany with Marina Abramovic, Cai Guo Qiang, Pascale Marthine Tayou, Jannis Kounellis, Surasi Kusolwong, and Nari Ward
- Tutto Normale (2002) in the gardens of the Villa Médicis Rome with Alighiero Boetti, Olaf Breuning, Claude Lévêque, Gianni Motti, Mimmo Paladino, Giuseppe Penone, Paola Pivi, and Barthélémy Toguo
- Intermission (2002) at the Pitti Foundation in Florence (Italy)
- Jan Fabre, Save Your Soul (2005), Maison Jean Vilar, during the Festival d'Avignon
- Here Comes the Sun (2005), co-curated with Daniel Birnbaum, Rosa Martinez and Sarit Shapira), Magasin 3, Stockholm with Pilar Albarracín, Francis Alÿs, Ghada Amer, Tacita Dean, Elmgreen & Dragset, Olafur Eliasson, Tobias Rehberger, Jeroen De Rijke, and Willem De Rooij
- Restlessness by Jan Lauwers at Bozar Brussels (2007)
- It's Not Only Rock’n’Roll Baby! Bozar Brussels, 2008 and Milan Triennial, 2010
- That's Fucking Awesome menalKlinik at Haskoy Yarn Factory (Istanbul) in 2011
- Le coup du fantôme (2013) with Sun Yuan & Peng Yu in Lille (France).
- AS I RUN AND RUN, HAPPINESS COMES CLOSER (2014) some selected pieces in Laurent Dumas's collection by Jérôme SANS at Hotel Beaubrun in Paris
- One Way: Peter Marino, Bass Museum, Miami (2014-2015)
- Painting as Shooting: Liu Xiaodong, avec la Fondation Faurschou, Fondazione Cini, Venise (2015)
- Diary Of An Empty City: Liu Xiaodong, Fondation Faurschou, Beijing (2015)
- Painting as Shooting : Liu Xiadong, Fondation Faurschou, Copenhagen (2016)
- Sislej Xhafa, Love you without knowing, the National Gallery of Kosovo (2018)
- Lilian Bourgeat, Des Mesures, Polygone Riviera, Cagnes-sur-mer (2018)
- :mentalKLINIK, OBNOXIOUSLY HAPPY, La Patinoire Royale, Galerie Valérie Bach, Bruxelles (2018)
- Eldorama, Lille 3000, Tripostal, Lille, Sans, Jean-Max Colard avec la collaboration d'Isabelle Bernini (2019)
- Les Enfants du Paradis, MuBA, Tourcoing, Sans, Jean-Max Colard avec la collaboration d'Isabelle Bernini (2019)
- Golden Room, Palais des Beaux-Arts de Lille, Sans, Jean-Max Colard avec la collaboration d'Isabelle Bernini (2019)
- Pascale Marthine Tayou, Black Forest, Fondation Clément, Martinique (2019)
- Racing the Galaxy, Nur-Sultan, Kazakhstan, Sans, Dina Baitassova (2019)
- Li Qing: Rear Windows, Fondation Prada, Prada Rongzhai, Shanghai (2019)
- Li Qing: Blow Up, Almine Rech, Londres (2019)
- Pablo Reinoso, Supernature, Polygone Riviera, Cagnes-sur-Mer (2019)
- Yu Hong: The World of Saha, The Long Museum, Shanghai (2019)
- Erwin Wurm: One Minute in Taipei, Taipei Fine Arts Museum [archive], Taipei (2020)
- Voyages Immobiles, for the 60 years of diptyque, Poste du Louvre, Paris (2021)
- Signs of the Times, Apalazzo Gallery, Brescia (2021)
- Floating Studio, Galerie Hussenot, Paris (2021)
- One minute forever, Erwin Wurm, Museum of Contemporary Art, Belgrade (2022)
- Shake Your Body, Lago/Algo, Mexico City (2022)
- Alicja Kwade, Au cours des mondes, Place Vendôme, Paris (2022)
- Desert Flood, Lago/Algo, Mexico City (2023)
- Bernar Venet, La parabole de l'histoire, Place Vendôme, Paris (2022)
- Historia, LagoAlgo, Mexico City (2023)
- Ida Yukimasa, Panta Rhei - For as Long as the World Turns, Kyoto City KYOCERA Museum, Japon (2023)
- The Bright Side of the Desert Moon, Noor Riyadh Festival 2023, Saudi Arabia (2023)
- Things and Something to Remember Before Daylight Joël Andrianomearisoa, galerie Almine Rech, Paris (2024)
- Heat, Julian Charrière, Ebecho Muslimova, Ana Montiel, Pedro Reyes, LagoAlgo, Mexico City (2024)
- ' 'I Feel the Earth Whisper', Bianca Bondi, Julian Charrière, Sam Falls, Ernesto Neto, Frieder Burda, Baden Baden (2024), co-curated with Patricia Kamp
- ' 'Inside Out', Stefan Brüggemann, Venet Foundation, Le Muy (2024)
- ' 'Naked City', Doug Aitken, Borusan Contemporary, Istanbul (2024)

== Books and publishing ==
Jérôme Sans has contributed to various art publications, such as Purple, Flash Art, Artforum, Artpress, UOVO, and Tema Celeste. He has also participated in the development of numerous exhibition catalogs for museums and private institutions.

In 1998, Jérôme Sans published the reference book Au Sujet de about Daniel Buren (Flammarion), followed by two others on the artists Jonas Mekas (Just Like A Shadow, Steidl, 2000) and Chen Zhen (Les entretiens, Presses du Réel, 2003). He also authored Araki by Araki (a compendium of photographs by Nobuyoshi Araki), published by Taschen in 2001, In The Arab World Now, published by Galerie Enrico Navarra in 2008, and Intermission 1 (a collection of photographs by Hedi Slimane), published by Pitti Immagine in 2002.

In 2004, he joined forces with Bertil Scali, a publisher and reporter, to launch Scali Editions, a publishing house dedicated to works focused on underground and contemporary cultures, including pop rock music, rap, electro, poetry, fiction, cinema, contemporary art, literature, notebooks, and eroticism. The house addressed neglected themes and subjects on the fringe or considered controversial, such as the history of Gay Pride by Oliviero Toscani and Goth culture by Patrick Eudeline. Approximately 200 books were published between 2004 and 2008, featuring authors such as Richard Bronson, Jonas Mekas, Virginie Despentes, Nina Roberts, Jean-Charles de Castelbajac, Joey Starr, Bruce Benderson, Marie Darrieusec, and Brian Epstein.

More recently, Jérôme Sans completed a series of pocket books that incorporate interviews with artists and architects, including Kendell Geers (2013), Ma Yansong (2012), and Jannis Kounellis (2012), published by BlueKingfisher Ltd. He is currently working on a new volume about the American artist John Giorno.

He is also the author of Araki on Araki, a collection of photos by the artist Nobuyoshi Araki, published by Taschen in 2000; In The Arab World Now, published by the Enrico Navarra Gallery in 2008; and Intermission 1, a collection of photos by Hedi Slimane, published by Pitti Immagine in 2002. In 2015, he co-published, with Jean-Marc Decrop, the book China: The New Generation (Ed. Skira), focusing on the emerging Chinese art scene. In 2016, he published Lipstick Flavor: A Contemporary Art Story with Photography (Ed. Damiani) in collaboration with Marla Hamburg Kennedy. In 2018, together with Laura Salas Redondo, he published Cuba Talks: Interviews with 28 Artists (Ed. Rizzoli), which reveals the dynamism of the contemporary Cuban art scene. In 2019, he curated the exhibition Racing the Galaxy (Ed. Skira) in Nur-Sultan, Kazakhstan, and co-published the accompanying catalog, highlighting both major and emerging figures from the burgeoning Kazakh art scene and its spirit of nomadism, in dialogue with artists from other parts of the world.

== Films ==
Jérôme Sans is the co-author, alongside Pierre Paul Puljitz, of the documentary Jonas Mekas, I Am Not A Filmmaker (2012), which has been screened at numerous film festivals. He is currently preparing another documentary about the American author, movie director, and artist Kenneth Anger.

He collaborated with Kiki Allgeier on creating portrayals of the members of the creative community LM100 for Le Méridien Hotels & Resorts (between 2006 and 2013) and directed the film Breaking the Silence, which focused on AIDS in Mozambique as a special commission from UNICEF.

For the Whitewall Magazine website in 2012, Jérôme Sans created two three-minute video portraits of architect Ma Yansong and painter Yu Hong.

He has also served as the artistic director for a portrait of MadeIn Company (Xu Zhen) in his studio, focusing on a work created for the 2013 Biennale de Lyon. This film, directed by Yang Bo (4 minutes and 20 seconds), was produced for Zilli and is available on the company's website; it was screened alongside the artist's work.

== Music ==
Jérôme Sans is also the founder of the French electro-pop band Liquid Architecture, which he created with Audrey Mascina. Their first album, Revolution is Over, was produced by the French record label Naïve in 2006. In 2009, they became the first French band to be signed to the Chinese label Modern Sky, releasing their second album, I Love to Love.

== Bibliography (selection) ==
- Pascale Marthine Tayou, Vaudou Child, Entretien In/Interrompu avec Jérôme Sans, Beaux-Arts de Paris Editions, 2021
- Erwin Wurm, One Minute in Taipei, Taiwan, Taipei Fine Arts Museum Editions, 2020
- Adel Abdessemed, Catalogue raisonné des cartons d'invitation [expositions personnelles 2001-2019], Editions Marval-RueVisconti, 2020.
- Pascale Marthine Tayou, Black Forest, HC Editions, 2020.
- Racing the Galaxy, Jérôme Sans, Dina Baitassova, Skira, 2019.
- Jannis Kounellis, Naviguer entre les écueils, Galerie Lelong & Co, 2019.
- Cuba Talks, interviews with 28 contemporary artists, Jérôme Sans, Laura Salas Redondo, Rizzoli, 2019.
- Lipstick Flavor, A contemporary art story with photography, Jérôme Sans, Marla Hamburg Kennedy, Damiani, 2016.
- One Year with Zhao Zhao & Jérôme Sans, Pékin, Beijing Tang Contemporary Art, 2015.
- CHINA THE NEW GENERATION, Jérôme SANS, Jean-Marc DECROP, SKIRA, 2014
- Hand Grenades From My Heart, Kendell Geers edited by Jérôme Sans, Blue Kingfisher, 2013.
- Art China Now : And Tomorrow, Hong Kong, Blue Kingfisher, 2013.
- Smoke Shadows, Jannis Kounellis interviewed by Jérôme Sans, Blue Kingfisher, 2012.
- Bright City, Ma Yansong interviewed by Jérôme Sans, Blue Kingfisher. 2012.
- Raqib Shaw, Of beasts and super-beasts, Thaddaeus Ropac Gallery, Paris, 2012.
- Peter Lindbergh : The Unknown, Schirmer/Mosel Verlag, 2011, 200 pages
- Goudemalion : Jean-Paul Goude une rétrospective, Editions de la Martinière, 2011.
- Farhad Moshiri', Editions Ropac, Janssen, The Third Line & Perrotin, 2010.
- Wim Delvoye : knockin' on heaven's door, Tielt : Lannoo; Brussel : BOZAR Books, 2010
- China talks: interviews with 32 contemporary artists by Jerôme Sans, Beijing: Timezone 8, 2009.
- In the Arab world... Now, Enrico Navarra Gallery, 2008, Volume 3.
- Between the Silence : Fairy Tales by Sam Samore, New York : Starwood Hotels & Resorts Worlwilde, Le Méridien Books, 2007.
- Jonas Mekas: anecdotes, Paris: Scali, 2007.
- Jan Lauwers, Mercator, 2007. Jan Fabre, Acte sud, 2005.
- Jan Fabre, Arles, Actes sud, 2005.
- Chen Zhen: les entretiens, Paris: Palais de Tokyo; Dijon: Les Presses du réel, 2003.
- Araki by Araki', Taschen, 2002.
- Hedi Slimane, Intermission 1, Pitti Immagine, 2002.
- Kader Attia, Alter Ego', Kamel Mennour Gallery, 2002 (Exposition, 19 April – 14 May)
- Pierre & Gilles, Arrache Mon Coeur, Jérôme de Noirmont Gallery, 2001 (Jérôme Sans, Joram Harel)
- Au sujet de..., Interview with Daniel Buren, Paris: Flammarion, 1998.
- Erwin Wurm: One Minute Sculptures, Cantz, 1998.
- Place de L'ecriture, cinq oeuvres par Joseph Kosuth, de 'One and Three Chairs' à 'Ex-Libris'', J.-F. Champollion (Figeac)', Actes Sud, Arles, 2002, 46 pp. (Guy Amsellem, Joseph Kosuth, Martin Malvy, Jérôme Sans)
- "State of Emergency" in Mounir Fatmi, fuck the Architect, Lowave, 2009, 256 pp. (Pierre-Olivier Rollin, Frédéric Bouglé, Jean de Loisy, Paul Ardenne, Ariel Kyrou, Martina Corgnati, Jérôme Sans, Evelyne Toussaint, Nicole Brenez, Marc Mercier)
