= Memo Akten =

Multidisciplinary artist, computer scientist and researcher

- Born: 1975 (age 50–51); Istanbul, Turkey
- Citizenship: Turkish
- Education: Boğaziçi University (BSc), Goldsmiths, University of London (PhD)
- Occupations: Multidisciplinary artist, Computer scientist & Researcher
- Website: www.memo.tv

Memo Akten (born 1975) is a Turkish-born multidisciplinary artist, computer scientist and researcher. His work explores human machine entanglements through speculative simulations and data dramatizations, often engaging with themes of ecology, technology, spirituality, and collective intelligence. He serves as associate professor at the University of California, San Diego.

== Early life and education ==
Born in Istanbul, Turkey, in 1975, Akten holds a Bachelor of Science degree in Civil Engineering from Boğaziçi University in Istanbul. Later in 2021 he completed a PhD at Goldsmiths, University of London in Artificial Intelligence, in which he developed what he calls “Deep Visual Instruments”: interactive systems that use deep neural networks as a creative medium, while ensuring real-time, continuous, and meaningful human control.

== Career ==
Akten's practice spans a wide variety of media, including moving images, sound, poetry, dance, light, performance, and installations. In 2011, he co-founded the art-technology studio Marshmallow Laser Feast where he worked as creative and technical director. He left the studio in 2014 to focus on his PhD and his personal research. Akten's technical and artistic leadership spans early works involving interactive real-time projection mapping, light and laser control, as well as later works that engage deeply with deep neural networks and Artificial Intelligence.

In the field of academics, Akten is currently an associate professor at the University of California, San Diego. He has presented research at major conferences, including NeurIPS and SIGGRAPH, connecting his artistic practice to scientific inquiry. In 2024, he co-founded Superradiance Lab with Katie Hofstadter, establishing an interdisciplinary research space that explores consciousness, intelligence, and planetary systems through embodied experience and emerging technologies.

Akten's work has been exhibited at venues such as the Venice Biennale, Barbican, Grand Palais, Mori Art Museum, Tretyakov Gallery, and others. His works are held in collections including Borusan Contemporary, the Guy & Myriam Ullens Foundation and the Vanhaerents Art Collection.

Akten has collaborated with notable figures and brands including U2, Depeche Mode, Lenny Kravitz, Richard Dawkins, Google, Apple, Twitter, and Sony. He has served as a mentor and jury member for international conferences and awards, including Ars Electronica, SIGGRAPH, and Google Arts & Culture.

== Awards and honors ==
- 2013 - Won the Prix Ars Electronica Golden Nica for his collaborative work Forms
- 2024 - Tribeca Immersive Official Selection, Tribeca Film Festival (Embodied Simulation)
