= Philip Tinari =

American writer, critic and art curator

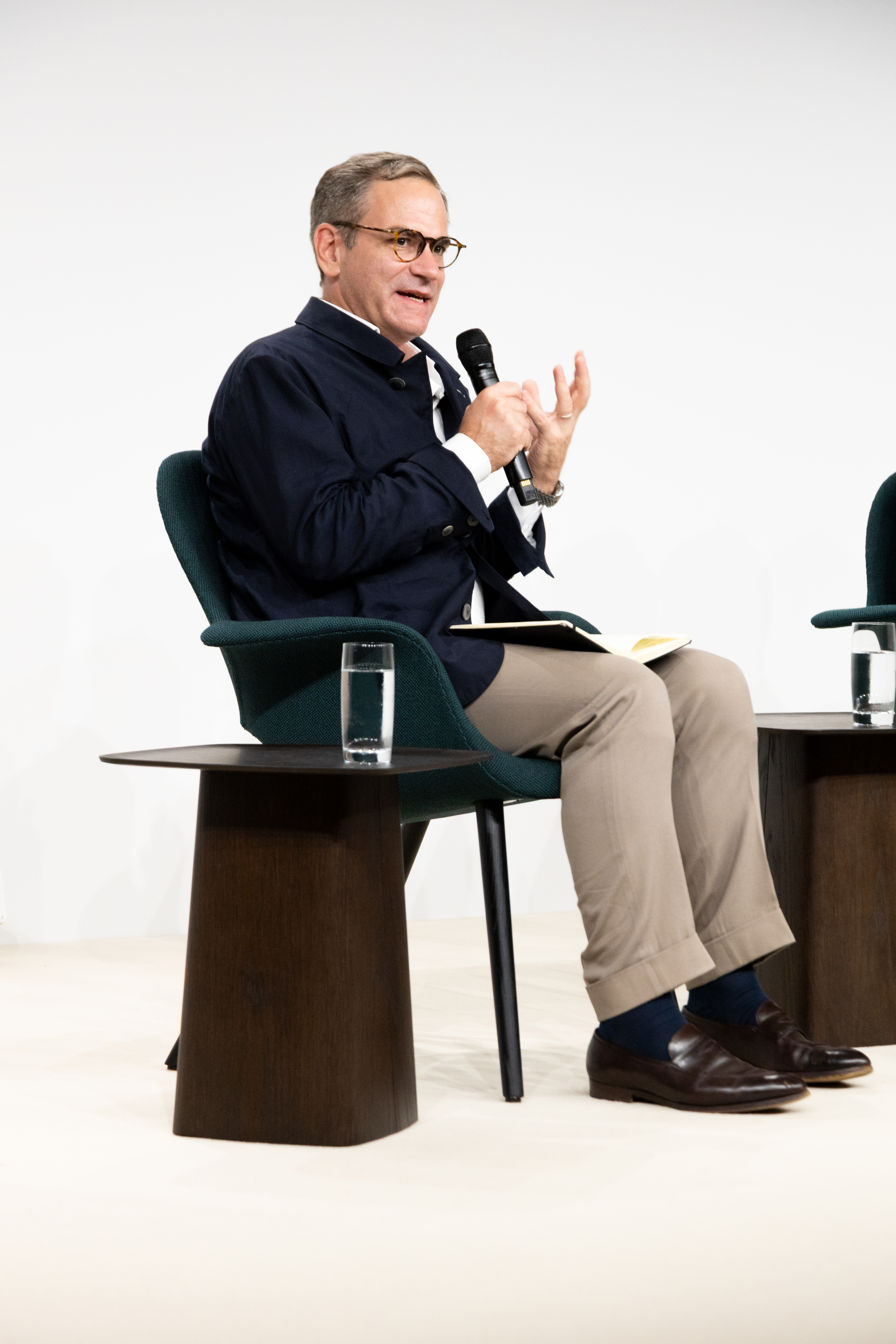
- Born: 1979 (age 46–47); Philadelphia, Pennsylvania, U.S.
- Other names: Phil Tinari
- Occupations: Director of UCCA Center for Contemporary Art, CEO of UCCA Group
- Known for: Contemporary Chinese art, founding editor of LEAP Magazine, founding editor of the Chinese edition of Artforum, director of UCCA Center for Contemporary Art

Philip Tinari (born 1979, Philadelphia) is an American writer, critic, art curator, and expert in Chinese contemporary art. Based in Beijing since 2001, Tinari was the director and CEO of the UCCA Center for Contemporary Art (UCCA) in Beijing. In January 2026, Tinari was appointed as deputy director and head of art at Hong Kong’s Tai Kwun cultural complex.

== Education ==
Tinari holds a bachelor's degree from Duke and a Master's from Harvard. Fluent in Chinese, he was a Fulbright fellow at Peking University.

== Career ==
Prior to arriving at UCCA in 2011, Tinari worked as China representative for Art Basel, and lecturer in art criticism at the China Central Academy of Fine Arts. He is a contributing editor at Artforum, having launched the magazine's Chinese edition artforum.com.cn in 2008. In 2009 he launched LEAP, "the international art magazine of contemporary China," and edited the magazine until 2012. He has written and lectured extensively on contemporary art in China.

Tinari joined UCCA as director in 2011, and assumed the concurrent post of CEO in 2017. At UCCA, Tinari oversees an exhibition program devoted to established and emerging artists both Chinese and international, aimed at UCCA's annual public of approximately a million visitors. Under his leadership the institution has built its international reputation and successfully transitioned from the ownership of its founders Guy and Myriam Ullens to that of a council of Chinese and international patrons. In 2018 he led the museum through the opening of a second location, UCCA Dune, in Beidaihe, China. A third location, UCCA Edge, is planned to open at the heart of Shanghai in spring 2021. In 2026, Philip Tinari was appointed as deputy director and head of art at Hong Kong’s Tai Kwun cultural complex.

== Other activities ==
Tinari serves on advisory boards including the Guggenheim Asian Art Council and the gallery committee at the Asia Society Hong Kong Center. He is a World Economic Forum Young Global Leader and a fellow of the Public Intellectuals Program of the National Committee on US-China Relations.

Tinari was a member of the jury that selected Lubaina Himid as recipient of the Maria Lassnig Prize in 2023.

== Exhibitions ==
Since arriving at UCCA in late 2011, Tinari has mounted exhibitions including Gu Dexin: The Important Thing is Not the Meat, Kan Xuan: Millet Mounds (later included in the 2013 Venice Biennale), Yung Ho Chang + FCJZ: Material-ism, ON|OFF: China's Young Artists in Concept and Practice, Duchamp and/or/in China, Wang Xingwei, Tino Sehgal, Wang Keping, and Taryn Simon: A Living Man Declared Dead and Other Chapters, I-XVIII. In 2018, Tinari co-curated Xu Bing's most comprehensive retrospective, "Xu Bing: Thought and Method", in collaboration with independent curator Feng Boyi. In 2021, Tinari led the curatorial team of "Cao Fei: Staging the Era", Cao Fei's first major institutional solo show and mid-career retrospective in China. In the same year, Tinari is to curate the inaugural Diriyah Biennale in Saudi Arabia.

Outside of UCCA, in 2014 he curated the Focus: China section of The Armory Show in New York. Together with Alexandra Munroe and Hou Hanru, in 2017 he co-curated “Art and China after 1989: Theater of the World” which opened at the Solomon R. Guggenheim Museum in New York, before subsequently touring to the Guggenheim Bilbao and SFMOMA.
