= May Xue =

Chinese museum director (born 1973)

- 薛梅
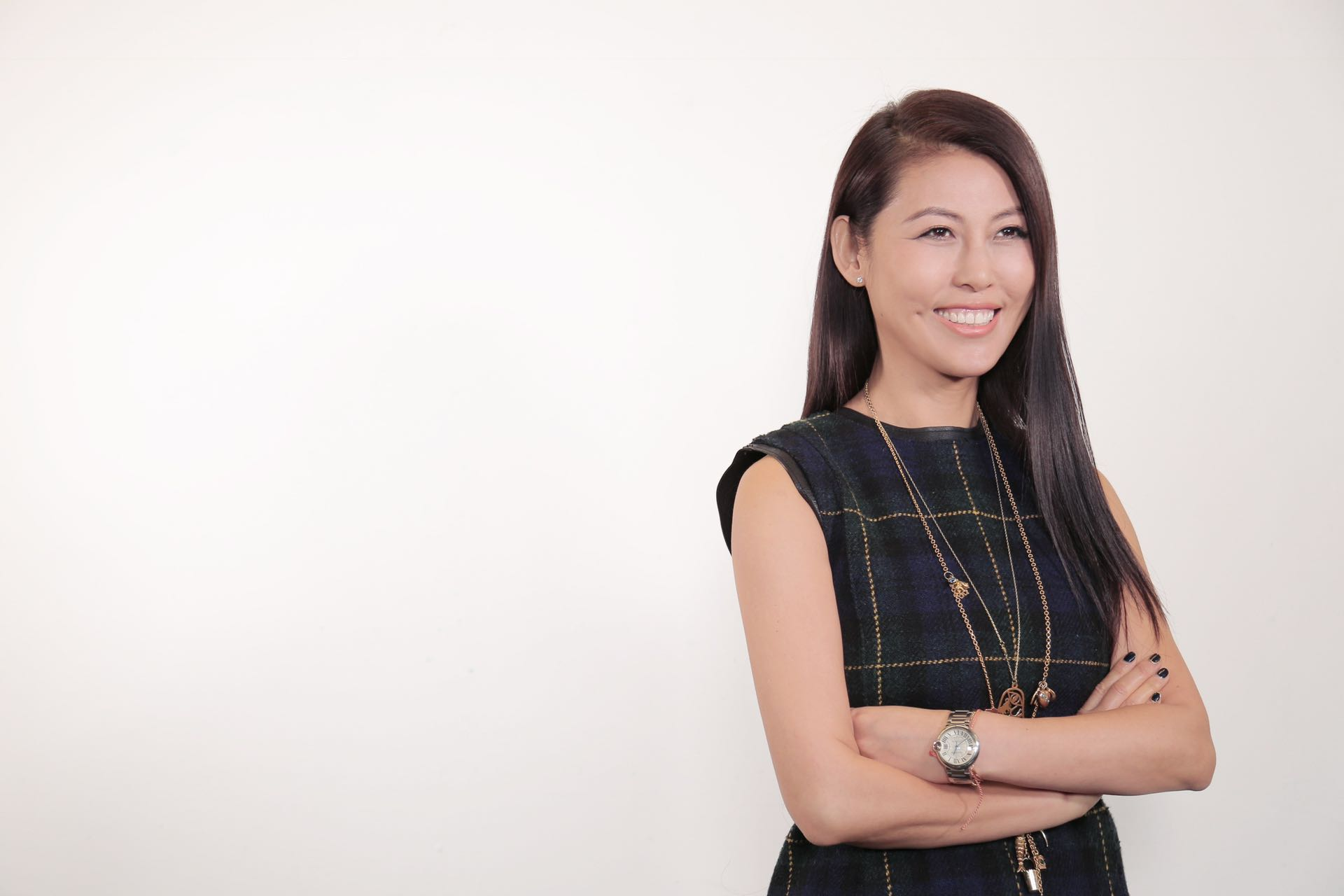
- Recent photo of Xue
- Born: Mei Xue; July 5, 1973 (age 53); Xi'an, China
- Occupation: Museum CEO

May Xue was the CEO of the Ullens Center for Contemporary Art in Beijing, China from 2011 to 2017. Prior to becoming CEO, Xue was the UCCA Store retail director. In 2015, Xue was named one of the 7 Women in Contemporary Chinese Art You Need to Know by ArtNet News.

== Biography ==
Xue was born in Xi'an, China. In 1985, Xue moved to Shandong where she would finish her schooling all the way through university where she would earn a bachelor's degree in Hotel Management at Shandong University.

In 1994, Xue was introduced to an opportunity in Beijing, China, to work as an assistant for Pittler Group China's chief representative. Xue quickly built a good reputation within the company and was sent to the Goethe Institut in Beijing to study German. After completing two semesters at the Goethe Institut, she continued to work for Pittler Group China.

In 1998, Xue joined CapitalClub China where she was hired as a membership officer. It only took Xue six months to be promoted to membership manager for China. Two years after her first promotion, Xue was once again promoted; this time to Capital Club's director of China. In 2002, Xue was awarded a chance to travel to any city in the world through Capital Club and chose Los Angeles, California. The director of ClubCorp (Capital Club's parent company) in Los Angeles immediately offered Xue a position. Xue spent three years working as a private events manager for City Club on Bunker Hill in Los Angeles before moving back to China in 2005.

Xue continued to work at Capital Club in Beijing, this time as a marketing director, until late 2005 where she took on a position in Chengdu, China, at the China Club (private business club) as a general manager.

In 2006, Xue was hired by Cartier to become the area retail manager of North China. Xue spent one-year at Cartier before starting her own public relations company called Imperial Connect. The company last just under two years (2007-2009). During those two years, Imperial Connect partnered with Jet Set Sports to become a VIP host for the 2008 Beijing Olympics where Xue held the role of event manager. Imperial Connect also worked with Hainan Airlines to host the inaugural China to Seattle flight event. Most of Imperial Connect's clients were in the art industry. The Bruce Lee Gallery was one of Imperial Connect's clients. Xue, still running Imperial Connect, also worked with the Kent Logan Foundation, Lawrence Schiller, Chinese Contemporary Art Awards (CCAA) and Uli Sigg.

This prompted Xue's entry into the art industry. In November 2008, shortly after Xue finished the CCAAs at UCCA, she was offered job by founder Guy Ullens who brought her on as UCCA Store retail director. In 2011, Xue was promoted to CEO of UCCA. In 2017, Xue announced her resignation.

In 2017 Xue began working for K11 Art Foundation (Shenyang, Beijing, Tianjin) Art Museum General Manager, Shenyang K11 Art Center design, opening preparations, exhibition curatorial, Beijing K11 Art Project architectural design, project management, content strategy planning, opening preparations, Tianjin K11 Art content planning, researching, preparations.

She also serves as the Director of Education and Institutional Relations of the K11 Art Foundation. Together with the newly appointed members of the K11 Art Foundation in November 2017, she continue to fulfill its commitment to promote the development of contemporary Chinese art and help KAF explore and support contemporary Chinese artists with a global perspective and artistic creation.
