= Ullens =

Ullens is a surname. Notable people with the surname include:

- Guy Ullens (1935–2025), Belgian art collector and philanthropist
- Myriam Ullens (1952–2023), Belgian entrepreneur, wife of Guy

== See also ==
- Fredrik Ullén (born 1968), Swedish pianist
