= Cookie Factory =

Art gallery

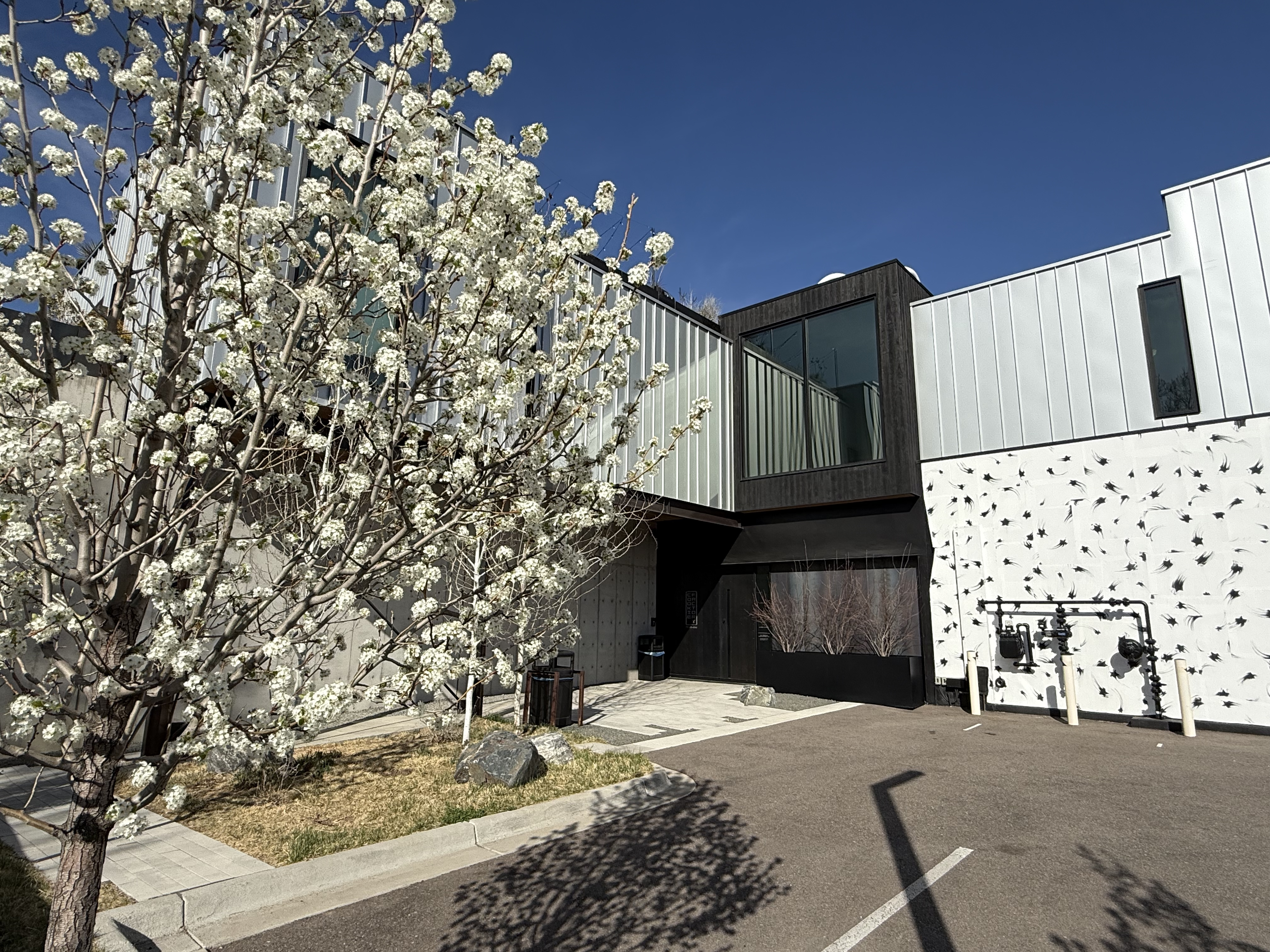
- Cookie Factory entrance on West 4th Avenue in Denver's Baker neighborhood
- Established: 2025
- Location: Baker, Denver, Colorado, US
- Coordinates: 39.7228°N 104.9936°W
- Type: Contemporary art space
- Founder: Amanda J. Precourt
- Executive director: Amanda J. Precourt
- Director: Andrew Jensdotter
- Curator: Jérôme Sans
- Website: cookiefactorydenver.com

Cookie Factory is a privately funded contemporary art space located in the Baker neighborhood of Denver, Colorado, United States. Opened to the public in May 2025, the 5,000-square-foot public art space is housed in a former fortune cookie factory.

== History ==
The art space was founded by real estate developer and art collector Amanda J. Precourt, who acquired an abandoned fortune cookie factory in the Baker neighborhood of Denver in 2016. The building at 425 W. 4th Ave., originally built in 1941, was first a paper mill before housing Sunrise Food Products Inc. for more than six decades. It took nine years to renovate the space into art galleries on the first level and a private apartment on the second level. The space opened to the public in May 2025; Jérôme Sans serves as artistic director and curator.

== Mission and programming ==
The art space hosts rotating exhibitions and contains gallery space, an outdoor sculpture garden, and video-screening rooms. All work shown at the Cookie Factory is site-specific and created in Colorado. Cookie Factory invites artists to create site-specific projects inspired by the landscapes and culture of Denver and Colorado at large. Cookie Factory is non-commercial, privately funded, and free and open to the public, established to facilitate community and collaboration in Denver.

In addition to art exhibitions, Cookie Factory produces public programs designed to amplify the themes of the exhibitions on view.

== Exhibitions ==
The inaugural exhibition was Nothing Without Nature, a solo exhibition by Sam Falls, which ran May through September 2025 and featured new paintings, photography, and video work. Fall's work explores humankind's relationship with the environment, and much of the work exhibited in Nothing Without Nature was created on-site in Colorado's Yampa River Valley.

In November 2025, Cookie Factory opened Rush, a solo exhibition by American artist Gary Simmons. The installation features work from Simmons' erasure series, and includes large-scale wall drawings, new paintings, a wheatpaste installation on the building's facade, and a participatory reading room.

== Reception ==
Writing in Axios in May 2025 about the space's opening, Alayna Alvarez said, "Cookie Factory isn't just another private collection dressed up as a museum. It's a fresh model that's intimate, immersive and rooted in Colorado." Zoe Stockwell of 303 Magazine described Cookie Factory as "a gift to Denver, introducing new artists to the community who haven't had the opportunity to let their work shine."

Writing for The Colorado Sun, Parker Yamasaki said "it's an unusual model, one that merges Precourt's aesthetic sensibilities with her philanthropic tendencies with her upbringing in Denver." Interviewing Sans for Frieze, Terence Trouillot praised the space as "a very human-scale institution" and "a paradigm shift."
