= A Living Man Declared Dead and Other Chapters =

Photographic series by Taryn Simon

A Living Man Declared Dead and Other Chapters, I – XVIII
- Author: Taryn Simon
- Language: English
- Published: 2011
- Publisher: MACK
- Publication place: United Kingdom
- Pages: 864
- ISBN: 9781907946059

A Living Man Declared Dead and Other Chapters, I – XVIII is a photographic series by artist Taryn Simon that was executed in a four-year period (2008–2011), during which Simon travelled across the world tracing and researching different bloodlines. The series comprises 18 "chapters" that document individual bloodlines. The chapters are investigations of fate, blood, psychological inheritance and what the artist refers to as "a relentless persistence of birth and death, and an endless collection of stories in between."

== Background ==
Each "chapter" has three parts: image, text, and footnotes. The first part is composed of a rigorous system of images in which the subject, their ascendants, and descendants are photographed after being interviewed on a plain, off-white background, stripped from any cultural context. The images are then placed in rows alongside one another in a chronological order to represent the bloodline. Some of the subjects were not able to attend the shoot because of military service, dengue fever, a conflicting event, and women not being able to be photographed for religious or cultural reasons. In these cases, Simon leaves the space blank to represent a "gap" in the bloodline. The second part is the text, a panel composed of Simon's research about the bloodline she is documenting. The final part is what Simon calls "footnotes". Unlike the first part, these images do not have an orderly system of representation, and are presented in a more rhizomatic structure with the intention of representing information similarly to how it would be obtained in the digital age. The work incorporates elements of photography, text, design, and sculpture.

A Living Man Declared Dead And Other Chapters, I – XVIII was exhibited in Neue Nationalgalerie, Berlin, Germany (2011), Tate Modern in London, England (2011), The Geffen Contemporary at the Museum of Contemporary Art, Los Angeles, California (2012), Museum of Modern Art, New York, New York (2012), Corcoran Gallery of Art, Washington, DC (2013), The Pavilion Downtown, Dubai, United Arab Emirates (2013), Ullens Center for Contemporary Art, Beijing, China (2013), and Le Point du Jour, Cherbourg, France (2015).

== Chapter I ==
The title of the exhibition A Living Man Declared Dead is derived from Chapter I, in which Simon documents the bloodline of Shivdutt Yadav. Yadav, his two brothers, and his cousin were declared dead by state officials in Uttar Pradesh, India. The documents are a result of bribery in which city officials accept money in exchange for official death documents that result in the inheritance of hereditary land.

== Chapter II ==
The subject of Chapter II is the bloodline of Arthur Ruppin, an official sent by the Zionist Organization to Palestine in the early 1900s to scope out potential for Jewish settlements. In 1908, he moved to Palestine where he was delegated the task of acquiring new land and developing urban and rural autonomous Jewish settlements which were financed by Zionists. Ruppin's actions are seen as fundamental in the inauguration of the State of Israel.

== Chapter V ==
As part of Chapter V, Simon worked to document the bloodline of South Korean Choe Jangguen. Choe was an engineer aboard the ship Tongyeong in 1977 when captured amidst a conflict with the North Korean armed forces. Choe is one of the 500+ reported South Koreans abducted by North Korea after the Korean war who remain against their consent. In the footnotes of this chapter Simon photographed a VHS tape of Pulgasari, a film produced by director Shin Sang-ok, later captured by North Korea in order to utilize his film-making talents to improve the film industry in North Korea. The footnotes also include Megumi, a graphic novel about the abduction of Megumi Yokota, as a photograph of Tongyeong Port, where Cheo Jangguen was last seen leaving for a mission, as well as Choe's identity documents and photographs of his ship returning after his abduction by North Korean armed forces.

In 2013–2014, A Living Man Declared Dead series was exhibited at the Ullens Center for Contemporary Art in Beijing. Exhibition of the text panels for Chapter V was not allowed. In response, Simon exhibited the censored panels as black bars at Ullens alongside the rest of the exhibition. This rendition of Chapter V proposed a dialogue of censorship and political allegiances newly a part of the exhibition. The censored rendition of Chapter V entered the collection of the Solomon R. Guggenheim Museum in 2013.

== Chapter XV ==
In Chapter XV, Simon asked the State Council Information Office (SCIO) of the People's Republic of China in 2009 to choose a family to represent China. The SCIO selected the Su Qijian bloodline, a middle-class family from Beijing, with no particular reasoning provided. This chapter is one of the few of the series in which all members of the family were present for the photography shoot. In the footnotes Simon photographed a media tower, which was a request of SCIO, as well as a gift bag provided by SCIO. The text panel describes SCIO's role in circulating both internal and external media regarding Chinese national affairs.

The bloodline of Chapter XV demonstrates the evolution of the one-child policy, which was adopted by China between 1978 and 1980. The chapter was also acquired by the collection of the Solomon R. Guggenheim Museum in 2013.
