= Colonne Pascale =

Public art in Douala, Cameroon

La Colonne Pascale
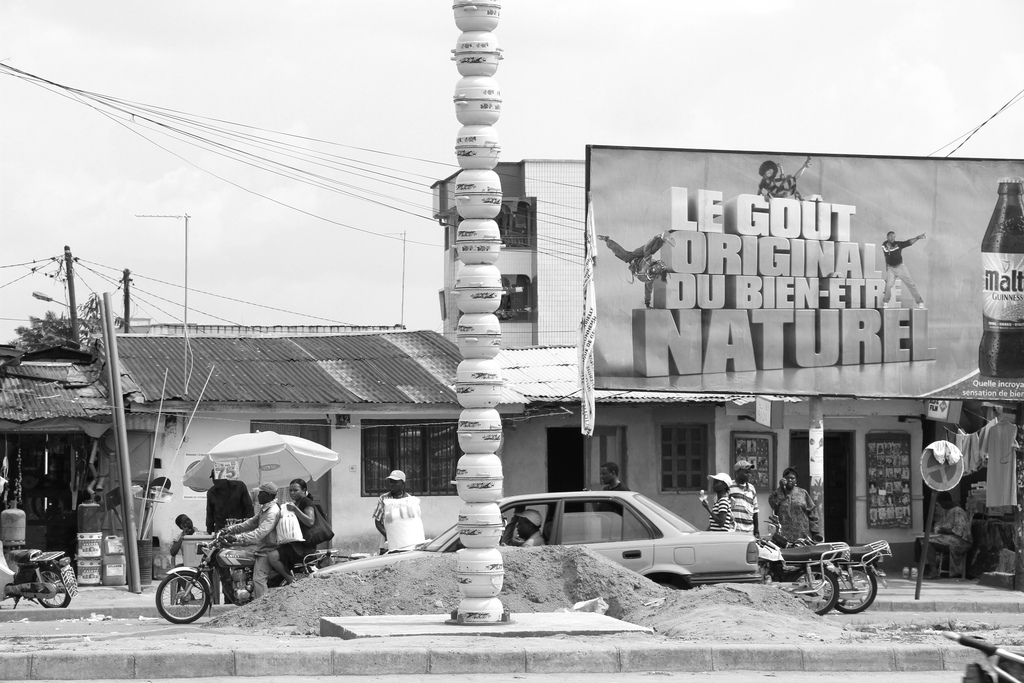
- Artist: Pascale Marthine Tayou
- Year: 2010
- Dimensions: 12 m (470 in)
- Location: Carrefour Shell, New Bell, Douala, Cameroon; 4.0212°N 9.7339°E
- Owner: Municipality of Douala

The Colonne Pascale is a permanent artwork located in the city of Douala (Cameroon). It was created by Pascale Marthine Tayou and inaugurated in 2010.

== The artwork ==
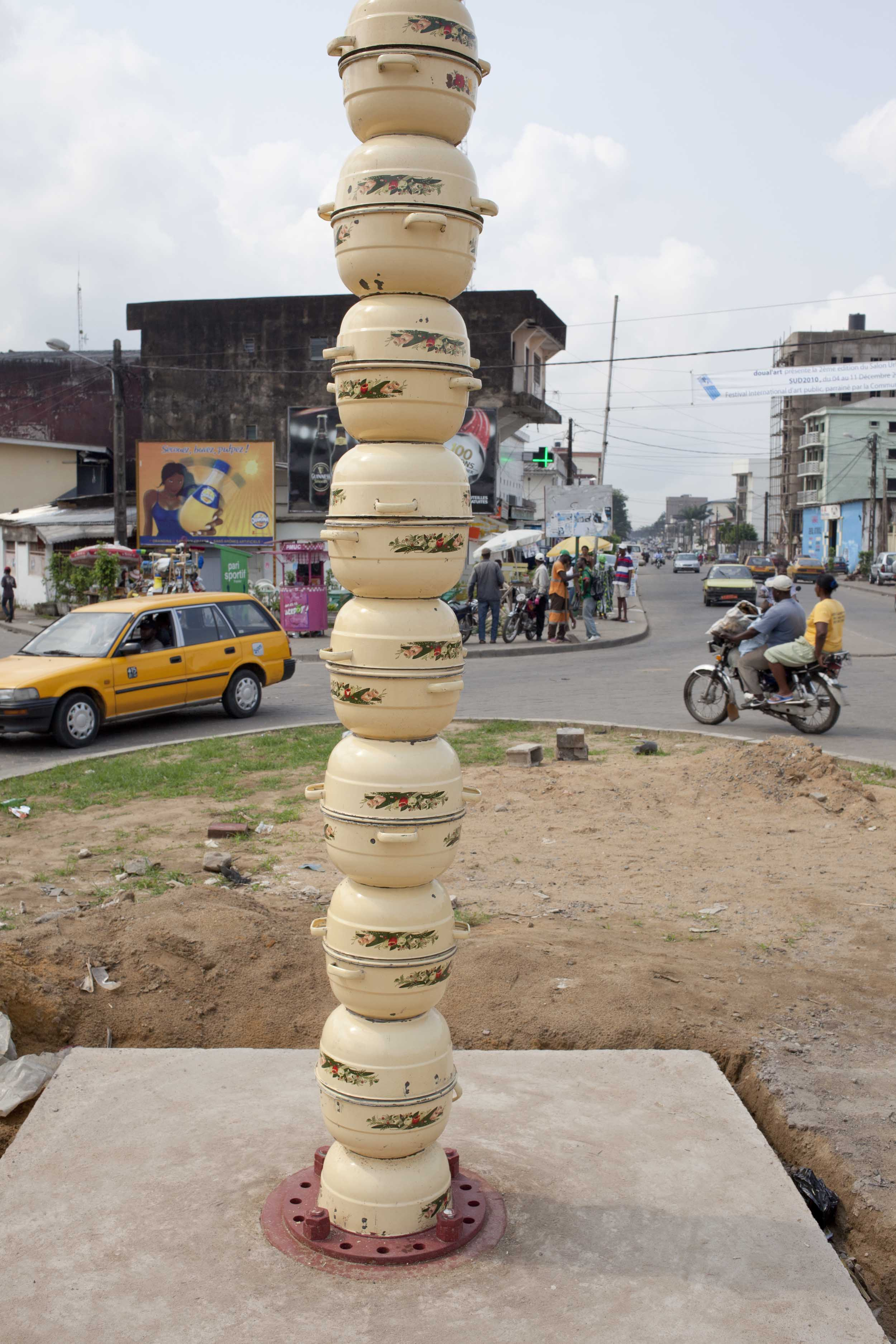

La Colonne Pascale consisted of pots in vitreous enamel, which were used in the past by the housewives to protect the food and the drinks. La Colonne Pascale is a simple and uncluttered dynamic line rising in the sky, located in the heart of a roundabout in the extremely lively quarter New Bell of Douala.

It is 12 meters (39 ft) high and constituted of a pile of 76 marmites and 38 lids.

The intention of the artist was to pay homage to African women giving value to the culinary culture of the Cameroonian tradition. Nevertheless, the artwork was the subject of debates and tensions from local residents. People's controversies depend both on the physical position of the Colonne Pascale, appealing to historical events (the square was the epicenter of the riots that led to the independence of the country), and for its symbolic interpretation, since according to many people the artwork recalls and highlights the poverty of New Bell.

The Colonne was renovated in 2013.

== See also ==
=== Bibliography ===
- Pensa, Iolanda (Ed.) 2017. Public Art in Africa. Art et transformations urbaines à Douala /// Art and Urban Transformations in Douala. Genève: Metis Presses. ISBN 978-2-94-0563-16-6
- Verschuren, K., X. Nibbeling and L. Grandin. (2012): Making Douala 2007-2103, Rotterdam, ICU art project
- Pucciarelli, M. (2015). «Culture and Safety in Douala: The Cases of New Bell and Bessengue », in Bonini Lessing, E. (ed.), Urban Safety and Security, Franco Angeli, pp- 69-79.
- Collection Privée, exh. cat. Parc de la Villette, ed. Acte Sud – Parc de la Villette, 2012, pages 44–45
- Always All Ways (tous les chemins mènent à ...), exh. cat. MAC Lyon and Malmö Konsthall, Gli Ori, Pistoia, 2011, page 298
- Pensa, I. (2012): «Public Art and Urban Change in Douala». In Domus, [7 April 2012).
- Van Der Lan, B. and Jenkins R.S. (eds) (2011). Douala: Intertwined Architectures, The Netherland: ArchiAfrica
- Van der Lans, B. (2010): «Salon Urbaine de Douala 2010». In Architecture plus, [30 December 2010).
- Schemmel, A. (2011) « Main discourses of the 2nd Salon Urbain de Douala (SUD) in Cameroon seen by an Indian runner duck». In Andrea Heister, Bonaventure Soh Bejeng Ndikung, (Re-) Mapping the field: a bird’s eye view on discourses. Berlin Germany, Savvy. Art, Contemporary, Africa.
- Schemmel, A. (2016): Visual Arts in Cameroon: A Genealogy of Non-formal Training, 1976-2014, Bamenda: Langaa Research & Publishing Common Initiative Group
- Lettera 27, (2013): «Trasformazioni urbane: l’edizione 2013 di SUD, a Douala» In Lettera 27. (29 Novembre 2013)
- Gourmelon, I. (2011): «Doual’Art 2010: Les parrains, les artistes et les autres…» In Les Instantanés Décales, (2 janvier 2011).
- Marta Pucciarelli (2014) Final Report. University of Applied Sciences and Arts of Southern Switzerland, Laboratory of visual culture.

=== Related articles ===
- List of public art in Douala
- Contemporary African art
