= UCCA Center for Contemporary Art =

Chinese independent institution of contemporary art

UCCA Center for Contemporary Art (UCCA)
- UCCA尤伦斯当代艺术中心
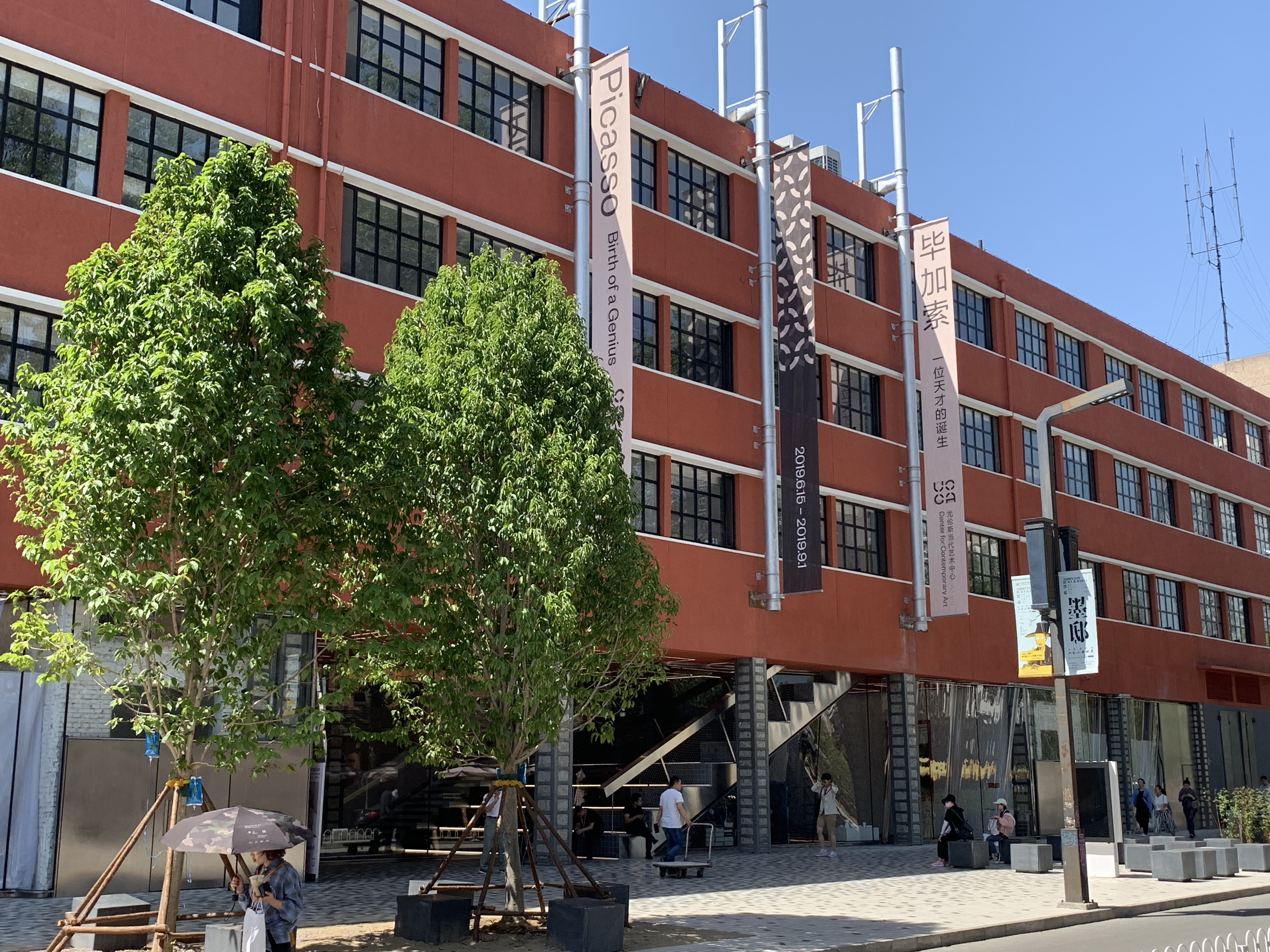
- Façade and entrance of UCCA Center for Contemporary Art, Beijing, May 2019
- Former name: Ullens Center for Contemporary Art
- Established: November 2007
- Location: 798 Art Zone, Beijing
- Coordinates: 39.989057°N 116.48793°E
- Visitors: 385,295 (2020)
- Founders: Guy and Myriam Ullens
- Director: Philip Tinari
- CEO: Philip Tinari
- Website: www.ucca.org.cn/en

UCCA Center for Contemporary Art or UCCA (simplified Chinese: 尤伦斯当代艺术中心; traditional Chinese: 尤倫斯當代藝術中心; pinyin: yóu lún sī dāng dài yì shù zhōng xīn) is a leading Chinese independent institution of contemporary art. Founded in 2007 and located at the heart of the 798 Art District in Beijing, China, it welcomes more than one million visitors a year. Originally known as the Ullens Center for Contemporary Art, UCCA underwent a major restructuring in 2017 and now operates as the UCCA Group, comprising two distinct entities: UCCA Foundation, a registered non-profit that organizes exhibitions and research, stages public programs, and undertakes community outreach; and UCCA Enterprises, a family of art-driven retail and educational ventures. In 2018, UCCA opened an additional museum, UCCA Dune, in Beidaihe, a seaside resort town close to Beijing. In 2021, a third site in Shanghai was opened, UCCA Edge. The museum had 385,295 visitors in 2020, and ranked 55th in the List of most-visited art museums in the world.

== History ==
In November 2007, out of a commitment to bring Chinese contemporary art into global dialogue, Belgian art collector Guy Ullens and his wife Myriam Ullens invested major resources in the founding of UCCA. UCCA's opening exhibition, curated by Guy and Myriam Ullens, alongside Foundation director and veteran of the Chinese avant-garde Fei Dawei, was entitled "'85 New Wave: The Birth of Chinese Contemporary Art," and was the first museum show to explore this artistic movement of the 1980s. In 2008, French critic and curator Jérôme Sans arrived as UCCA's first director, taking steps to open the center to a larger public with bold, popular exhibitions by key Chinese and international figures including Yan Pei-ming, Mona Hatoum, Qiu Zhijie, Olafur Eliasson, Liu Xiaodong, and Wang Jianwei.

In 2012, UCCA began its second chapter UCCA Dune, under the joint leadership of May Xue and Philip Tinari, focused on bringing the institution closer to its public and honing its operational model. Together, they introduced initiatives such as the Patrons Council, the first donor group of its kind in China, and the annual Gala and Benefit Auction, which quickly became a key source of support for UCCA's ongoing development. The exhibition program continued to grow in scale, featuring internationally recognized artists including Gu Dexin, Tino Sehgal, Xu Zhen, Liu Wei, William Kentridge, Robert Rauschenberg, and Zeng Fanzhi, as well as periodic research-based surveys and an ongoing series of project-based solo exhibitions focused on young Chinese artists.

In June 2017, a group of China-based investors came together to restructure UCCA, separating its commercial and non-profit functions, ensuring its long-term presence in the 798 Art District, and securing its future vision. In 2017, UCCA Director Philip Tinari served as guest co-curator for the Guggenheim exhibition "Art and China after 1989: Theater of the World," alongside Alexandra Munroe and Hou Hanru. The exhibition is the most comprehensive institutional survey show of Chinese art mounted to date in the United States, and a corrective to what Tinari views as narrow, American views of Chinese Contemporary Art.

In 2019, UCCA announced plans to open a third location along Shanghai's Suzhou Creek, in partnership with the Hong Kong-headquartered property conglomerate K. Wah International. UCCA Edge opened in Shanghai in 2021.

== Site and space ==
UCCA spreads across the original chambers of Factory 798, which is now Beijing's 798 Art District, designed by East German architects from the Dessau Design Institute—the postwar institutional successor to the Bauhaus—and first opened in 1957. UCCA's spaces maintain traces of their industrial past. Fully renovated by architects Jean-Michel Wilmotte and Qingyun Ma in 2007, UCCA occupies a total area of 8,000 square meters, including a Great Hall of 1,800 square meters, other exhibition halls of different sizes, a 150-seat auditorium equipped with film projection and simultaneous interpretation facilities, a store, a children's education center, and further areas for gatherings, meetings, and events. In 2018, UCCA enlisted the help of Dutch architectural firm OMA to redesign its spaces, adding a new café and a completely upgraded entrance area and exhibition halls. The basic regeneration was completed in 2019, and the museum plans to add a library and archive.

== Highlights ==
The center has presented more than a hundred exhibitions and attracted more than four million visitors. Beginning its curatorial program with "85 New Wave: The Birth of Chinese Contemporary Art", it has presented large-scale group shows "Breaking Forecast: 8 Key Figures of China's New Generation Artists" (2009), "ON | OFF: China’s Young Artists in Concept and Practice" (2013), and "Hans van Dijk: 5000 Names" (2014); along with solo exhibitions "Liu Xiaodong: Hometown Boy" (2010), "Wang Jianwei: Yellow Signal" (2011), "Gu Dexin: The Important Thing Is Not The Meat" (2012), "Wang Xingwei" (2013), "Xu Zhen: a MadeIn Company Production" (2014), "Liu Wei: Colors" (2015), and "Cao Fei: Staging the Era" (2021).

It has also presented the international surveys "Inside A Book A House of Gold: Artists' Editions for Parkett" (2012), "Indian Highway" (2012), "DUCHAMP and/or/in CHINA" (2013), and "The Los Angeles Project" (2014). It has served as a platform for the works of Olafur Eliasson, Tino Sehgal, Tatsuo Miyajima, Taryn Simon, and Sterling Ruby, introducing China to these significant figures in contemporary art.

On 11 February 2017, the Ullens Center for Contemporary Art received the 2016 Global Fine Art Awards for Best Contemporary / Postwar / SoloArtist "Rauschenberg in China".

== Public programs ==
Events include lectures, panel discussions, film screenings, performances, workshops, festivals, and community initiatives.

== Research ==
UCCA's research department focuses on organizing scholarly programming around UCCA exhibitions, and on organizing the ten years of archival material that the institution has already produced, to make it easily accessible online to students and researchers. In 2019, it will open a library and research space on its premises, featuring an extensive collection of physical and digital materials focusing on the three areas of UCCA's own history.

== UCCA Dune ==
Opened in 2018, UCCA Dune is UCCA's second museum, housed in Aranya, a seaside resort development in Beidaihe, approximately 300 kilometers from Beijing on the coast of the Bohai Sea. An award-winning design by Chinese firm OPEN Architecture integrates the museum into the sands of the beach it sits on. UCCA Dune's curatorial program often emphasizes the relationship between nature, humanity, and art.

== UCCA Edge ==
UCCA Edge opened as the third site in Shanghai in May 2021, located within the Jing'an District on Suzhou Creek. It was announced in partnership with Hong Kong-based K. Wah International in 2019 and designed by SO-IL, an architecture firm based in New York City. UCCA Edge occupies 5,500 square meters of space over three levels within the Shanghai EDGE tower. It has 1,700 square meters of gallery space as well as an outdoor terrace and public space including a lobby and auditorium.

== Controversy ==
In May 2014, Chinese artist Ai Weiwei accused UCCA of self-censorship when curators decided to omit his name from a public newsletter announcing the opening of an exhibition in memory of artist/curator Hans van Dijk. Ai had originally contributed three works to the exhibition, including the first piece he ever exhibited in Europe as part of an exhibition curated by van Dijk in 1993, but removed the works during the opening ceremony, "in defiance of UCCA's portrayal of Chinese contemporary art."

In September 2017, the Guggenheim decided to pull three major works from "Art and China After 1989: Theater of the World," co-curated by Philip Tinari, after concerns over animal welfare sparked threats of violence. When the exhibition toured to Guggenheim Bilbao in May 2018, two of the works in question were exhibited. The three works were not shown at SFMOMA when the exhibition opened there in November 2018.
