= Taryn Simon =

American multidisciplinary artist (born 1975)

- Born: February 4, 1975 (age 51); New York City
- Education: Brown University
- Known for: Conceptual art
- Notable work: A Living Man Declared Dead and Other Chapters
- Movement: Contemporary art
- Spouse: Jake Paltrow (m. 2010)
- Awards: Guggenheim Fellowship, The Alfred Eisenstaedt Award in Photography, International Center of Photography Infinity Award for publication, KLM Paul Huf Award

Taryn Simon (born February 4, 1975) is an American multidisciplinary artist who works in photography, text, sculpture, and performance.

Currently residing and maintaining a studio practice in New York City, Simon has had work featured in the Venice Biennale (2015). In 2001, Simon was selected as a Guggenheim Fellow.

== Early life and education ==
Simon was born in New York City and attended Brown University, where she initially studied environmental studies before graduating with a degree in art semiotics. While at Brown, she enrolled in photography classes at the neighboring Rhode Island School of Design. She received her BA in 1997. Simon's father traveled frequently for his government position, and was an enthusiastic photographer, opening her up to the art form.

== Works ==
=== The Innocents (2002) ===
In 2000, Simon was given an assignment by New York Times Magazine to photograph men who had been wrongfully convicted, which inspired her to explore photography's role in the criminal justice system. She applied for a Guggenheim Fellowship which allowed her to travel across the United States photographing and interviewing individuals who were wrongfully convicted. The Innocents depicts individuals sentenced to death or given life sentences largely due to mistaken identity, who were exonerated and released after DNA evidence proved their innocence. Simon photographed the subjects at sites significant to their wrongful conviction, such as the scene of the crime, misidentification, alibi, or arrest. The series was published as a book and exhibited in galleries and museums such as MoMA PS1, the Museum of Contemporary Photography, Gagosian Gallery, and others.

In Simon's foreword to the book she writes:

Photography's ability to blur truth and fiction is one if its most compelling qualities... Photographs in the criminal justice system, and elsewhere, can turn fiction into fact. As I got to know the men and women in this book, I saw that photography's ambiguity, beautiful in one context, can be devastating in another."

=== Black Square (2006– ) ===
Simon's website says of Black Square:

Black Square (2006–) is an ongoing project in which Simon collects objects, documents, and individuals within a black field that has precisely the same measurements as Kazimir Malevich's 1915 suprematist work of the same name.

It is about the consequences of man’s inventions.

In an interview with Kate Fowle of the Garage Museum of Contemporary Art, Simon described the first sculptural iteration of the project, Black Square XVII:

The goal was to construct a black square made from vitrified nuclear waste that would hold within it a letter that I had written to the future. The process of vitrification converts radioactive waste from a volatile liquid to a stable, solid mass resembling polished black glass. It is considered to be one of the safest and most effective methods for the long-term storage and neutralization of radioactive waste.

The waste is stored in a steel container reinforced with concrete, at a radon nuclear waste disposal plant outside of Moscow. It will remain at the radon facility, Simon explained, "until its radioactive properties have diminished to levels deemed safe for human exposure and exhibition—approximately one thousand years after its creation."

=== An American Index of the Hidden and Unfamiliar (2007) ===
An American Index of the Hidden and Unfamiliar reveals objects, sites, and spaces that are integral to America's foundation, mythology, or daily functioning but remain inaccessible or unknown to a public audience. These unseen subjects range from radioactive capsules at a nuclear waste storage facility to a black bear in hibernation to the art collection of the CIA. Simon has stated that she "wanted to confront the divide between public and expert access."

The book has 70 colour plates and a foreword by Salman Rushdie. Ronald Dworkin wrote a commentary, while curators Elisabeth Sussman and Tina Kukielski of the Whitney Museum of American Art wrote an introduction. It was published by Steidl and exhibited at the Whitney Museum of American Art in 2006. In 2007 it was on view at the Museum für Moderne Kunst in Frankfurt, Germany. She discussed the project with photography historian Geoffrey Batchen for the 8th volume of Museo.

Salman Rushdie wrote:

In a historical period in which many people are making such great efforts to conceal the truth from the mass of the people, an artist like Taryn Simon is an invaluable counter-force. Democracy needs visibility, accountability, light… Somehow, Simon has persuaded a good few denizens of hidden worlds not to scurry for shelter when the light is switched on, as cockroaches and vampires do, but to pose proudly for her invading lens…"

=== Zahra/Farah (2008/2009/2011) ===
Brian De Palma asked Simon to take the photograph that is the last shot of his 2007 film Redacted. She traveled to Jordan to shoot a young Iraqi actress, Zahra Alzubaidi, posed as if lying raped and burned, the victim of American soldiers. [...] Alzubaidi has received death threats from family members, who consider Redacted pornographic, and is seeking asylum in the U.S. Simon arranged for the photograph to be shown at [2011]’s Venice Biennale to draw attention to Zubaidi’s situation.

De Palma and Simon discussed their work and methods in a conversation published in Artforum:

De Palma: Look, the hard thing . . . is that once you have a project, you think about how you’re going to photograph the scene until you actually do it. I have always felt that the camera view is just as important as what’s in front of the camera. Consequently, I’m obsessed with how I’m shooting the scene. When you’re making a movie, you think about it all the time—you’re dreaming about it, you wake up with ideas in the middle of the night—until you actually go there and shoot it. You have these ideas that are banging around in your head, but once you objectify them and lock them into a photograph or cinema sequence, then they get away from you. They’re objectified; they no longer haunt you.

Simon: The haunting can be torturous. I don’t think I’ve ever enjoyed the making of my work. It’s a labor.

=== A Living Man Declared Dead and Other Chapters (2008-2011) ===
Simon's website says of A Living Man Declared Dead and Other Chapters, I–XVIII:

was produced over a four-year period (2008–2011), during which Simon traveled around the world researching and recording bloodlines and their related stories. In each of the eighteen 'chapters' that make up the work, the external forces of territory, power, circumstance, or religion collide with the internal forces of psychological and physical inheritance. The subjects documented by Simon include: the Zionist and Jewish establishments in Pre-Israel Palestine, feuding families in Brazil, victims of genocide in Bosnia, the body double of Saddam Hussein's son Uday, and the living dead in India. Her collection is at once cohesive and arbitrary, mapping the relationships among chance, blood, and other components of fate.

It probes complex narratives in contemporary politics and organizes this material within a system that connects identity, lineage, history, and memory.

In The Washington Post, Philip Kennicott wrote:

Simon’s chapters, although seemingly dry and archival, emerge as remarkably profound meditations on how we sort through the world, what ethical and moral impulses we honor and which ones we squelch. Her work insists on a more fundamentally rational relationship to photographs, and especially to photographs of people."

=== Contraband (2010) ===
Contraband is "an archive of global desires and perceived threats, encompassing 1,075 images of items that were detained or seized from airline passengers and postal mail entering the United States" from abroad, "taken at both the U.S. Customs and Border Protection Federal Inspection Site and the U.S. Postal Service International Mail Facility at John F. Kennedy International Airport, New York." From November 16 through 20, 2009, Simon "remained at JFK and continuously photographed items detained or seized from passengers and express mail entering the United States from abroad."

Simon’s images and lists embrace both order and disorder, and open up a third space within the cracks of these forms of control: a space of the surreptitious, the forgotten, the bizarre and the banal, exposed to the cold light of the camera…

=== Image Atlas (2012) ===
Created during rhizome.org's Seven on Seven conference, Image Atlas is a collaborative project between Simon and the programmer and internet activist Aaron Swartz. Image Atlas "investigates cultural differences and similarities by indexing top image results for given search terms across local engines throughout the world. Visitors can refine or expand their comparisons from the 57 countries currently available, and sort by Gross Domestic Product (GDP) or alphabetical order". In an extensive article on the Seven on Seven conference Ben Davis writes that "Simon suggested that the site might cut against 'the illusion of flattening' on the Web, offering some way of recovering a sense of the local." Curator Lauren Cornell, Adjunct Curator and former Director of Rhizome stated, "The Image Atlas proposes a singular method of retrieving and comparing pictures, to demonstrate the difference in a world supposedly flattened by the forces of the global economy."

=== Picture Collection (2013) ===
The Picture Collection (2013) was inspired by the New York Public Library’s picture archive, which contains "1.29 million prints, postcards, posters, and images", and is "the largest circulating picture library in the world", "[o]rganized by a complex cataloguing system of more than 12,000 subject headings". Simon sees this archive as a precursor to Internet search engines. In The Picture Collection, she "highlights the impulse to archive and organize visual information, and points to the invisible hands behind seemingly neutral systems of image gathering". It was developed in response to the online database Image Atlas (2012), created by Simon with computer programmer Aaron Swartz.

=== Birds of the West Indies (2013–14) ===
Simon’s Birds of the West Indies (2013–14) is a two-part work, whose title is taken from the "definitive taxonomy" of the same name by the American ornithologist James Bond. Author Ian Fleming, "an active bird-watcher living in Jamaica", used Bond's name for his novels’ protagonist. "This co-opting of a name was the first in a series of substitutions and replacements that would become central to the construction of the Bond narrative."

The first element of Simon's work is a photographic inventory of the women, weapons, and vehicles of James Bond films made over the past fifty years. This visual database of interchangeable variables used in the production of fantasy examines the economic and emotional value generated by their repetition. In the second element of the work, Simon casts herself as the ornithologist James Bond, identifying, photographing, and classifying all the birds that appear within the 24 films of the James Bond franchise. Simon’s discoveries often occupy a liminal space between reality and fiction; they are confined within the fictional space of the James Bond universe and yet wholly separate from it.

=== A Polite Fiction (2014) ===
Simon's website says of A Polite Fiction (2014):

Taryn Simon maps, excavates, and records the gestures that became entombed beneath – and within – the [Fondation Louis Vuitton's] surfaces during its five-year construction. Designed by Frank Gehry, [the Fondation] was built to house the art collection of Bernard Arnault, one of the world’s wealthiest individuals and owner of the largest luxury conglomerate in the world [LMVH]. Simon collects this buried history and examines the latent social, political, and economic forces pushing against power and privilege. . . . Items include copper and aluminum cables sold to scrap dealers; cement used by a father to build the walls of his daughter's bedroom; and an oak sapling that a worker took to Poland, planted, and named after his boss. The custody and movement of these objects transform their value, as they pass from employer to worker and, ultimately, to artist.

=== Paperwork and the Will of Capital (2015) ===
The photographs and sculptures of Paperwork and the Will of Capital (2015) take as their subject matter the signings of political accords, contracts, treaties, and decrees in which powerful men flank floral centerpieces curated to convey the importance of the signatories and the institutions they represent. The signings that inform Paperwork and the Will of Capital involve the countries present at the 1944 United Nations Monetary and Financial Conference, in Bretton Woods, New Hampshire, which addressed the globalization of economies after World War II. This led to the establishment of the International Monetary Fund (IMF) and the World Bank.

Teju Cole wrote for The New York Times Magazine:

Simon noticed the ubiquity of floral displays at these occasions. To refocus attention on the workings of power at these signings, she took an oblique approach: a re-creation of the flower arrangements. The flowers were originally a decorative note, a reflex to signal the importance of the occasion. Reconstructed, they are not mere decorations. The people are gone. The documents are absent. The isolated arrangements are like secrets that can be parsed only with the help of their captions.

=== An Occupation of Loss (2016, 2017) ===
According to Simon's website, in An Occupation of Loss (2016):

professional mourners simultaneously broadcast their lamentations, enacting rituals of grief. Their sonic mourning is performed in recitations that include northern Albanian laments, which seek to excavate “uncried words”; Wayuu laments, which safeguard the soul’s passage to the Milky Way; Greek Epirotic laments, which bind the story of a life with its afterlife; and Yezidi laments, which map a topography of displacement and exile.

Within a monumental sculptural setting, An Occupation of Loss combines performance, sound, and architecture and:

considers the anatomy of grief and the intricate systems we use to manage contingencies of fate and the uncertain universe. . . The abstract space that grief generates is often marked by an absence of language. . . Results are unpredictable; the void opened up by loss can be filled by religion, nihilism, militancy, benevolence—or anything.

An Occupation of Loss was co-commissioned by the Park Avenue Armory and Artangel.

Jerry Saltz described his experience of the performance and installation:

After being admitted through a side second-story entrance, 50 or so viewers descend a long staircase to see 11 cement silos or circular towers almost 50 feet high, opened at the top and arranged in a semicircle. It's like a giant pipe organ. Long ramps lead to a slightly elevated oblong opening at the foot of each tower. Viewers may duck inside. There, in intimate quarters usually seated on a bench, are professional mourners from 11 different countries...

He describes mixed feelings of intrusion and empathy as he listens to the mourners' expression of inconsolable grief.

== Difficulty Photographing ==
=== Censorship in China ===
Simon experienced several barriers while photographing and exhibiting in China for A Living Man Declared Dead, having to work through strict confines. She faced difficulty bringing her equipment in to China, coordinating shoots, and working with government officials to find subjects to photograph.

When exhibiting A Living Man Declared Dead in China, a full chapter covering a South Korean man who had been kidnapped by North Korea had been censored completely.

=== Walt Disney World ===
Simon attempted to document the facilities below the Magic Kingdom. When requesting access, she received a faxed letter indicating it would break the illusion of the 'magic' guests experience while in the park. The letter, she says, provided her with "the most poetic and perfect punctuation" for An American Index of the Hidden and Unfamiliar.

== Publications ==
- The Innocents. New York: Umbrage, 2003. 2nd ed., New York: Umbrage, 2004
- An American Index of the Hidden and Unfamiliar. Exhibition catalogue, Whitney Museum of American Art. Göttingen: Steidl, 2007. 2nd ed., Göttingen: Steidl, 2008. 3rd ed., Ostfildern: Hatje Cantz, 2012
- Contraband. Göttingen: Steidl/New York: Gagosian Gallery, 2010. 2nd ed., Ostfildern: Hatje Cantz, 2015
- A Living Man Declared Dead and Other Chapters I – XVIII. Exhibition catalogue, Tate Modern/Neue Nationalgalerie. Berlin/London: Nationalgalerie Staatliche Museen/Mack, 2011. 2nd ed., London/New York: Wilson Center of Photography/Gagosian Gallery, 2012
- Birds of the West Indies and Field Guide to Birds of the West Indies. Ostfildern: Hatje Cantz, 2013
- Rear Views, a Star-Forming Nebula, and the Department of Foreign Propaganda (Retrospective). London: Tate Publishing, 2015
- Paperwork and the Will of Capital. Ostfildern: Hatje Cantz Verlag, 2016
- The Picture Collection. Paris: Edition Cahiers d'Art, 2017
- An Occupation of Loss. Ostfildern: Hatje Cantz, 2017

== Public collections ==
Simon's work is held in the following public collections:

- Museum of Modern Art, New York
- Metropolitan Museum of Art, New York
- Whitney Museum of American Art, New York
- Pérez Art Museum Miami, FL
- Centre Pompidou, Paris
- Tate Modern, London
- Victoria and Albert Museum, London
- Neue Nationalgalerie, Berlin
- J. Paul Getty Museum, Los Angeles
- Library of Congress, Washington, D.C.
- Los Angeles County Museum of Art, CA
- Museum of Contemporary Art, Los Angeles
- High Museum of Art, Atlanta, GA
- Museum of Fine Arts, Houston, TX
- Solomon R. Guggenheim Museum, New York
- Museum of Contemporary Art, San Diego

== Exhibitions ==
- MoMA PS1, Long Island City, New York, USA, Taryn Simon: The Innocents, 2003
- Whitney Museum of American Art, New York, USA, Taryn Simon: An American Index of the Hidden and Unfamiliar, 2007
- The 7th Gwangju Biennale Annual Report: A Year in Exhibitions, Gwangju, South Korea, 2008
- Institute of Modern Art, Brisbane, Australia, Taryn Simon: An American Index of the Hidden and Unfamiliar, 2009
- Musée National d'Art Moderne, Paris, 2009
- Centre d'Art Contemporain Genève, Genève, Switzerland, Taryn Simon: Contraband, 2011
- Neue Nationalgalerie, Berlin, Germany, Taryn Simon: A Living Man Declared Dead and Others Chapters I - IVIII, 2011
- Tate Modern, London, A Living Man Declared Dead and Other Chapters, 2011
- Danish Pavilion, Venice Biennale, Venice, Italy, Speech Matters, 2011.
- The Geffen Contemporary at the Museum of Contemporary Art, Los Angeles, CA, Taryn Simon: A Living Man Declared Dead and Others Chapters I - IVIII, 2012
- Museum of Modern Art, New York, A Living Man Declared Dead and Other Chapters, 2012
- The Pavilion Downtown, Dubai, United Arab Emirates, Taryn Simon: A Living Man Declared Dead and Other Chapters I - IVIII, 2013
- Ullens Center of Contemporary Art, Beijing, China, Taryn Simon: A Living Man Declared Dead and Other Chapters I - IVIII, 2013
- Fondation Louis Vuitton, Paris, France, Taryn Simon: A Polite Fiction, 2014
- MOCAK - Museum of Contemporary Art in Kraków, Kraków, Poland, Taryn Simon: The Picture Collection, 2014
- Jeu de Paume, Paris, France, Taryn Simon: Rear Views, A Star-Forming Nebula and the Office of Foreign Propaganda, 2015
- Albertinum, Dresden, Germany, A Soldier is Taught to Bayonet the Enemy and not Some Undefined Abstraction, 2016
- Tel Aviv Museum of Art, Tel Aviv, Israel, Taryn Simon: Paperwork and the Will of Capital, 2016
- Galerie Rudolfinum, Prague, Czech Republic, Taryn Simon, 2016
- Garage Museum of Contemporary Art, Moscow, Russia, Action Research/The Stagecraft of Power, 2016
- Park Avenue Armory, New York, An Occupation of Loss, 2016
- Montreal Museum of Contemporary Art, Montreal, Canada, Leonard Cohen: A Crack in Everything, 2017
- Solomon R. Guggenheim Museum, New York, USA, Taryn Simon: Father Country I Do Love You, 2026–2027

== Awards and nominations ==
- 1999: The Alfred Eisenstaedt Award in Photography, Columbia University, New York.
- 2001: Guggenheim Fellowship in Photography, New York.
- 2007: KLM Paul Huf Award, Foam Fotografiemuseum Amsterdam.
- 2008: Silver Medal Lead Award, Germany.
- 2008: International Center of Photography Infinity Award for publication, New York.
- 2009: Deutsche Börse Photography Prize Finalist.
- 2010: Discovery Award at Rencontres d'Arles, Provence, France.
- 2011: Author Book Award at Rencontres d'Arles, Provence, France.
- 2011: Contemporary Book Award, Rencontres d'Arles, Provence, France, for A Living Man Declared Dead and Other Chapters.
- 2017: Honorary Fellowship of the Royal Photographic Society, awarded to distinguished persons having, from their position or attainments, an intimate connection with the science or fine art of photography or the application thereof..

== Personal life ==
Simon has been married to director Jake Paltrow since 2010. The couple has two children. They live in New York's Greenwich Village.
