= Ebecho Muslimova =

American visual artist

Ebecho Muslimova (born 1984 in Makhachkala, Dagestan, RU) is a visual artist based between New York City and Mexico City, best known for her comic‑absurdist alter ego Fatebe, who features in her drawings, paintings, and works on paper.

== Early life and education ==
Muslimova was born in 1984 in Makhachkala, Dagestan, RU. She moved to the United States and earned her Bachelor of Fine Arts at the Cooper Union in New York City in 2010.

== Career and artistic practice ==
While studying sculpture at Cooper Union, Muslimova began drawing "Fatebe", a flat, cartoon‑like figure created during critiques as a form of emotional coping. Fatebe soon became central to her work, evolving from sketchbook drawings into staged paintings and performances on canvas and paper.

Her works often depict Fatebe in surreal, slapstick or grotesque scenarios that blend humour, vulnerability, physical extremity, and abjection. Muslimova's visual language deliberately plays with flatness and graphic form, placing Fatebe in contradictory contexts that explore shame, pleasure, control, identity, anxiety, and the body’s limits.

Muslimova has described Fatebe not as a direct alter ego but as a “surrogate self” or mechanism for rendering internal experiences in a simplified yet emotionally resonant visual form.

== Gallery representation and exhibitions ==
Ebecho Muslimova is represented internationally by several contemporary art galleries. In New York, she is represented by Magenta Plains, where she has held multiple solo exhibitions since 2016. In Europe, she is represented by Bernheim (formerly Galerie Maria Bernheim) in Zürich, with additional representation in Brussels. In Brazil, she is represented by Mendes Wood DM, based in São Paulo, with which she has exhibited her work since 2024.

Her works have also been exhibited through collaborations with institutions and fairs including David Zwirner (London), Art Basel, and Kunsthall Stavanger.

Selected solo exhibitions include:

- 2025 – Ebecho Muslimova & Maria Lassnig, Magenta Plains, New York, USA
- 2024 – Whispers, Bernheim, Zürich, Switzerland
- 2024 – Rumors, Mendes Wood DM, São Paulo, Brazil
- 2023 – FOG, Magenta Plains, New York, USA
- 2021 – Fatebe Digest, David Zwirner, London, UK
- 2021 – Scenes in the Sublevel, The Drawing Center, New York, USA
- 2020 – FATEBE, Galerie Maria Bernheim, Zürich, Switzerland
- 2019 – TRAPS!, Magenta Plains, New York, USA
- 2017 – Fatebe, Galerie Maria Bernheim, Zürich, Switzerland
- 2016 – Fatebe, Magenta Plains, New York, USA
- 2015 – Ebecho Muslimova, ROOM EAST, New York, USA

== Critical reception and themes ==
Muslimova’s work has been widely recognized for its distinctive blend of grotesque humor, physical exaggeration, and psychological complexity. A central figure in her practice is Fatebe, a cartoon-like alter ego whose elastic body and surreal scenarios serve as both comedic device and subversive commentary on embodiment.

In a 2023 review of Fog at Magenta Plains, The New York Times critic Max Lakin described Fatebe as “a flat, fluid line drawing whose urges know no refusal,” noting she exists “somewhere between Cronenbergian body horror and complete liberation.” In an earlier 2021 review, Will Heinrich highlighted Scenes in the Sublevel at The Drawing Center, calling Fatebe “an unruly but oddly graceful figure” who appears in “narratives that combine slapstick, abjection and surrealism.”

In Frieze, Anthony Hawley interpreted Fatebe as “delighted with her uncanny ability to consume, contort, expel and become alternative forms,” positioning the character as a critique of bodily norms and patriarchal expectations. Flash Art emphasized the destabilizing spatial logic of Scenes in the Sublevel, while reviews in Hyperallergic and FAD Magazine compared Fatebe to slapstick and caricature figures, exploring themes of shame, vulnerability, and resistance through absurdity.

== Personal life ==
As of the mid‑2020s, Muslimova spends her time between New York City and Mexico City, where she also maintains a studio practice.
