= Pascale Marthine Tayou =

Cameroonian artist (born 1966)

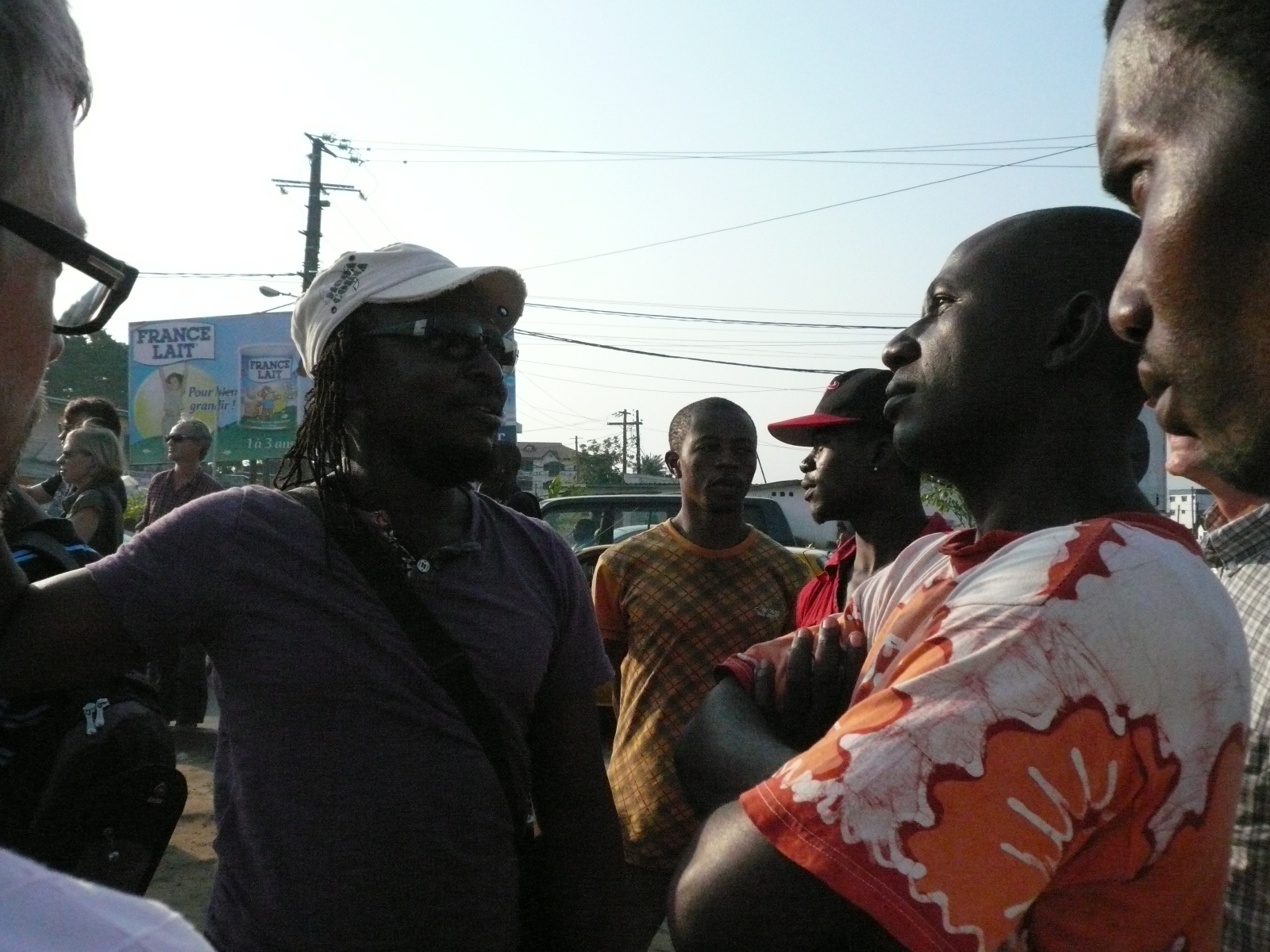
- Pascale Marthine Tayou at SUD Salon Urbain de Douala
- Born: 1966 (age 59–60); Yaounde, Cameroon
- Known for: sculpture, drawing
- Awards: ARKEN Prize
- Website: pascalemarthinetayou.com

Pascale Marthine Tayou (born 1966) is a Cameroonian artist born in Nkongsamba, Cameroon. He lives and works in Ghent, Belgium and in Yaoundé, Cameroon.

He began his career as an artist in the 1990s, and has carried out exhibitions in Cameroon, Germany, France, and Belgium, among others. His work combines various mediums and seeks to artistically redefine postcolonial culture and raise questions about globalisation and modernity. Formerly known as Pascal Marthin Tayou, he changed his name to Pascale Marthine Tayou in the 1990s, thus distancing himself ironically from the importance of artistic authorship and male/female ascriptions. He is represented by Galleria Continua.

== Works ==
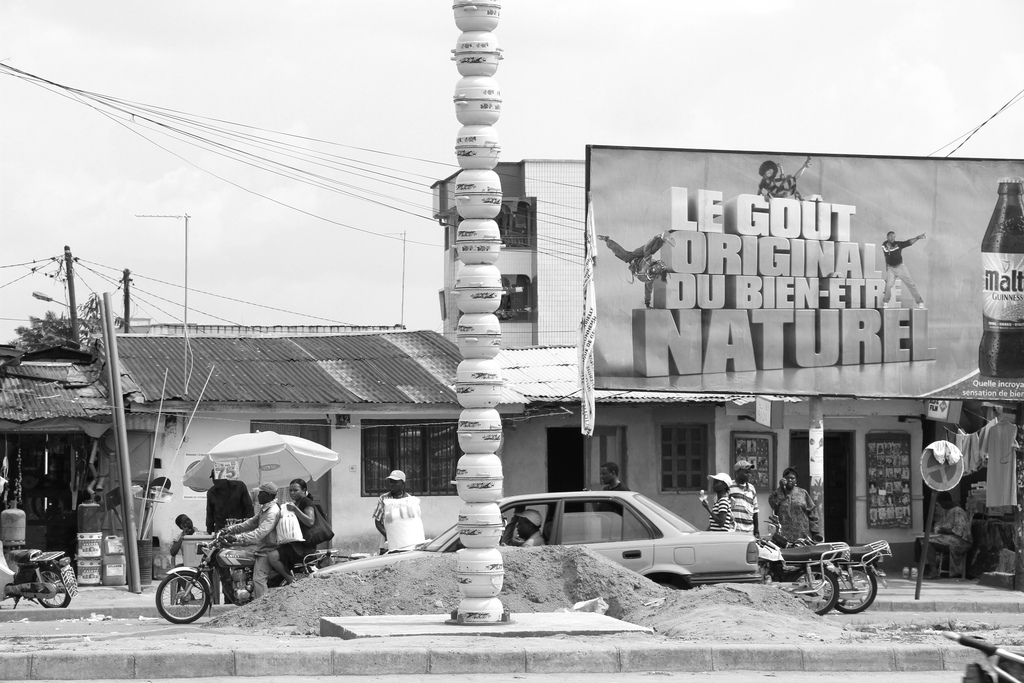
Pascale Marthine Tayou, Colonne Pascale, SUD-Salon Urbain de Douala, Douala, 2010. Photo Roberto Paci Dalò

Tayou is recognised nationally and internationally for his artistic works. He is associated with the Douala-based doual'art association, which has contributed significantly to promoting the artist to the international scene. His first works focused on drawing and sculpture that expressed societal problems such as AIDS. More recently, he combines popular visual cultures and social realities through improvisational styles to construct installations that depict post-colonial African lifestyles and contemporary social, political and cultural realities across countries. Tayou, who now works and lives in Belgium, has travelled extensively across the globe to showcase his exhibitions. The artist describes himself as an explorer, one who moves across the world to explore the common issues of the global village.

"His work is directly influenced by the scenes he witnesses in the countries he visits. He collects ephemera from his journeys, including train and airline ticket stubs, restaurant and shop receipts and labels or wrappings for socks, razors, batteries and plastic bags. Tayou's insistent reuse and recycling of these objects reminds us that contemporary life is inextricably linked with economics, migration and politics."

Tayou won the 2011 ARKEN Prize, awarded by the Annie & Otto Johs. Detlefs' Philanthropic Foundation at Copenhagen, presented on 17 March 2011. This prize of DKK 100,000 is one of the largest art prizes in Denmark. It was awarded for his ability to create a compelling and challenging work that relates to pressing issues in the modern, globalised world.

Tayou became the 4th "artistic sponsor" of the milanese Velasca Football Club founded by Wolfgang Natlacen in 2015.

== Gallery of works ==
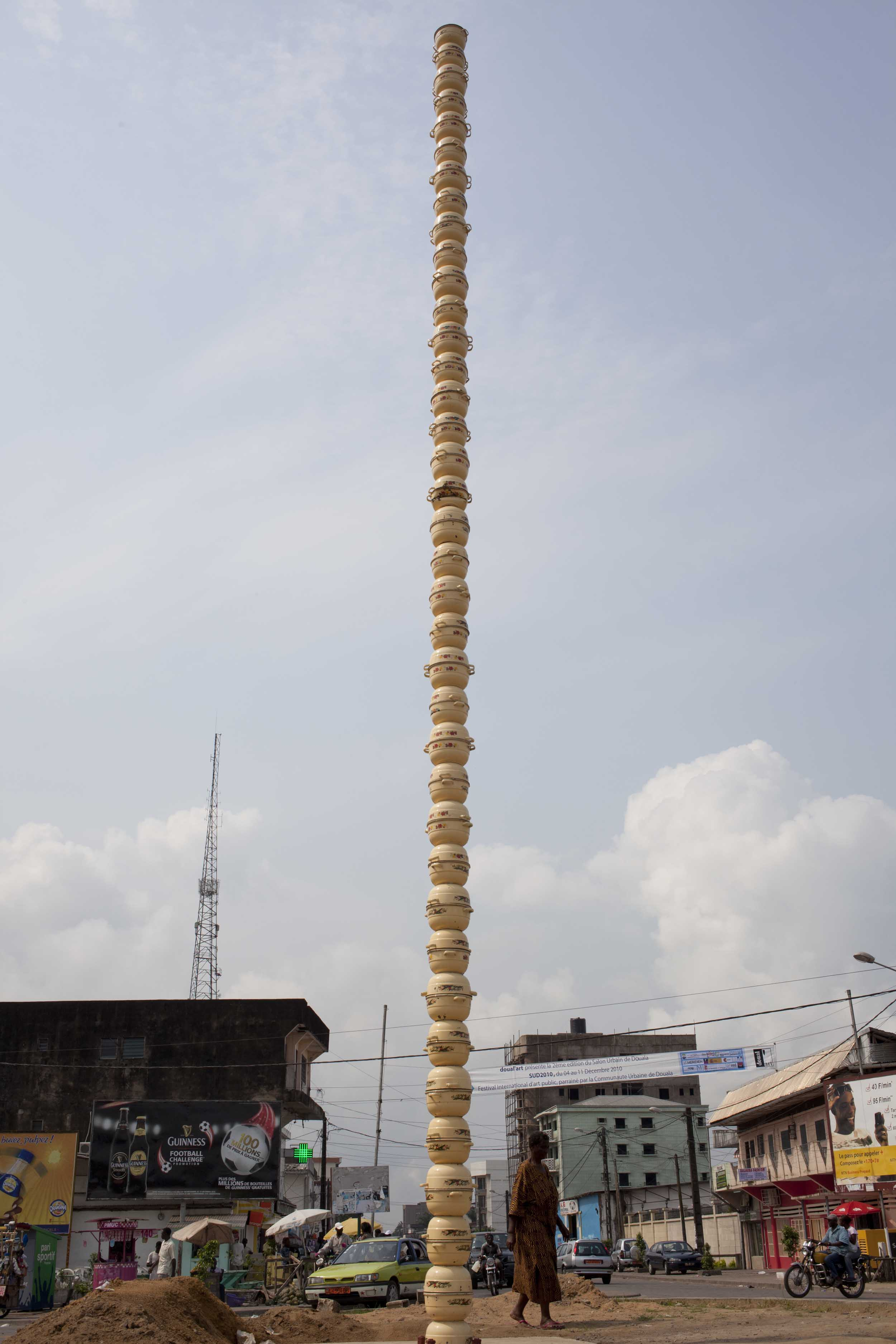

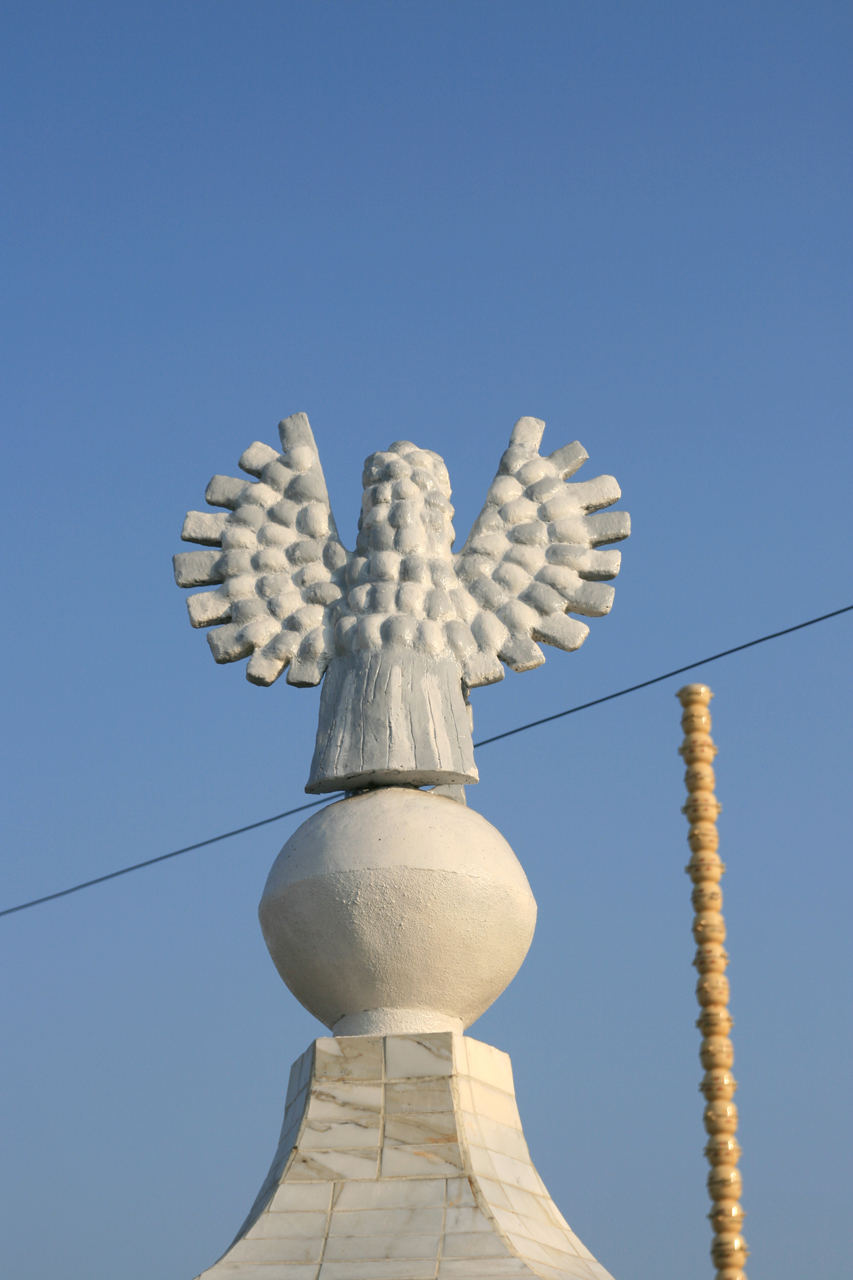

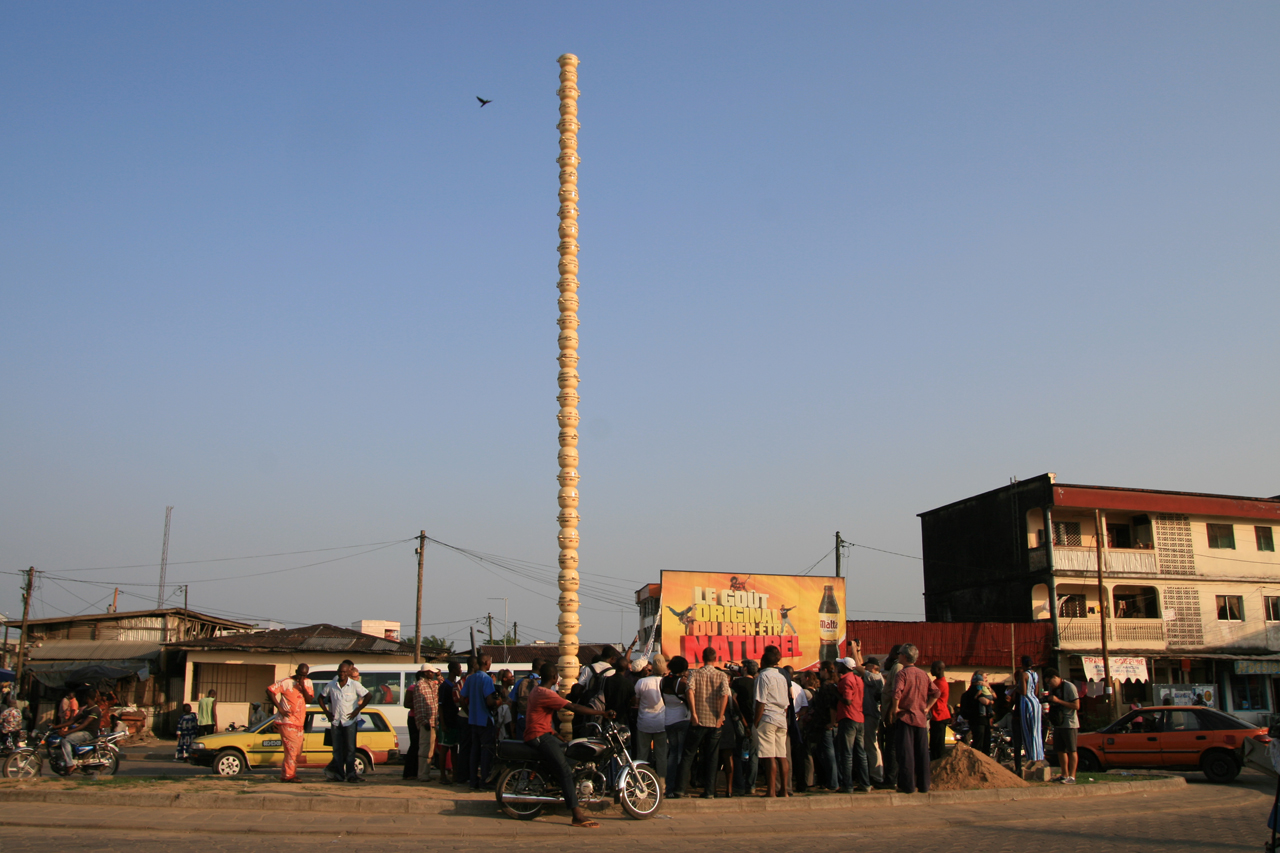

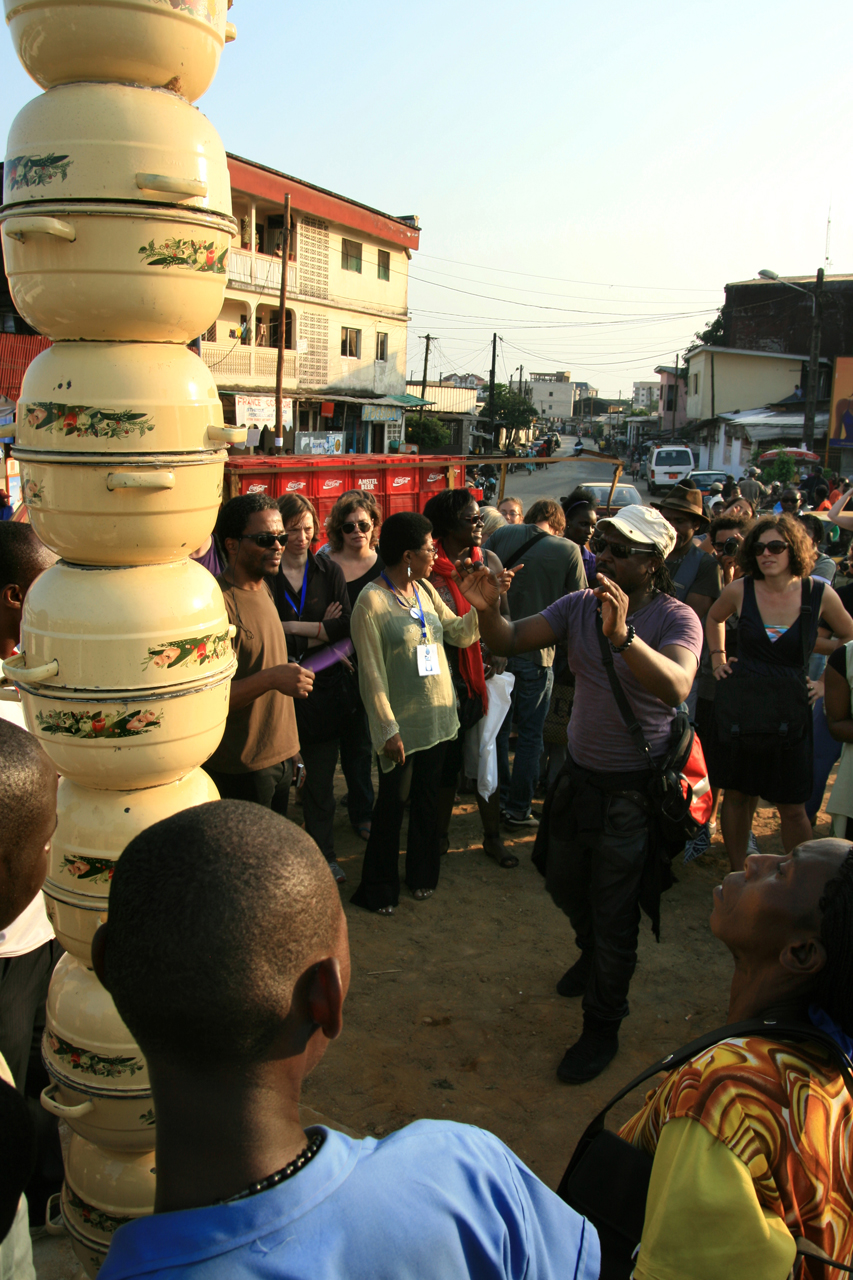

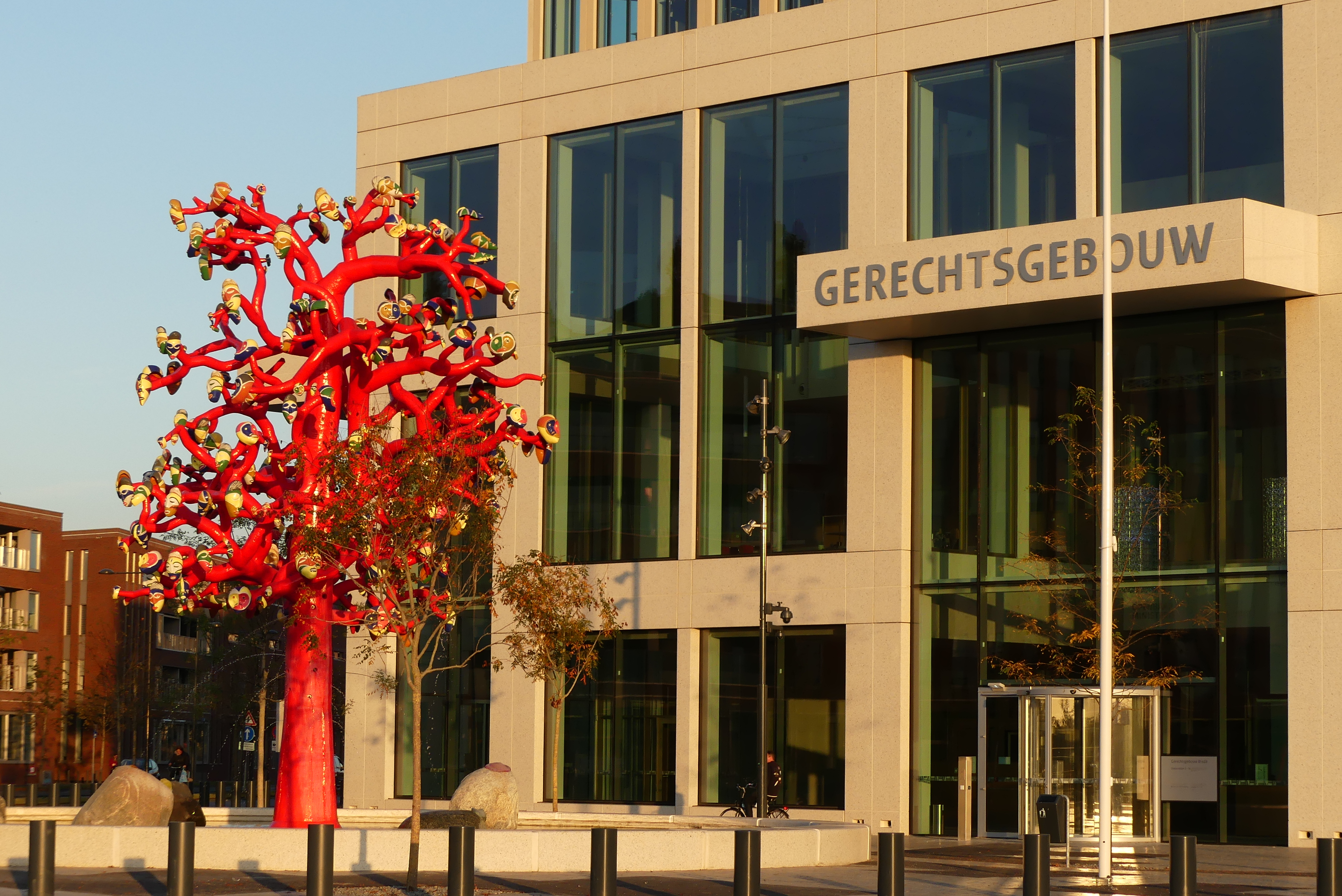

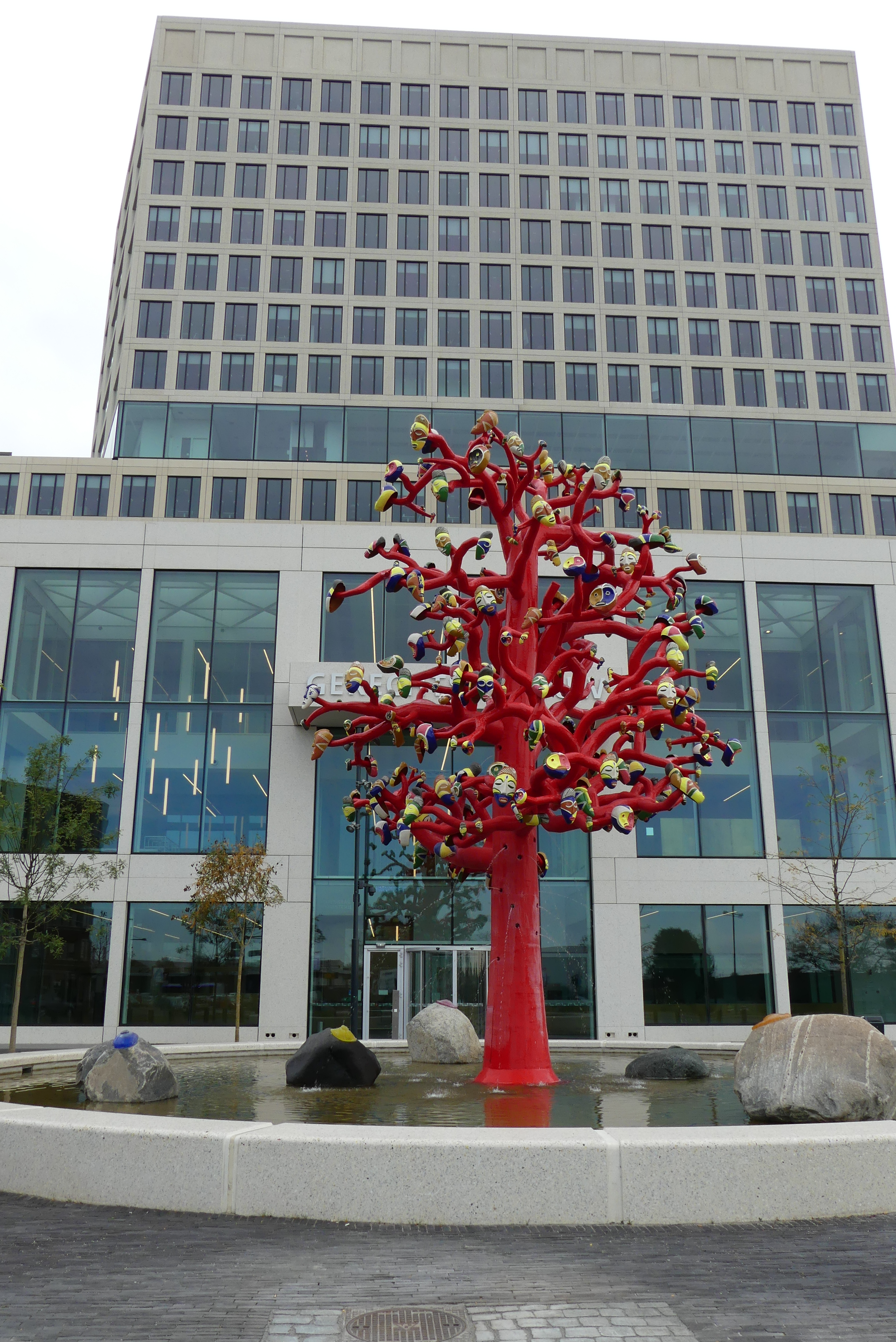

== Exhibitions ==
Pascale Marthine Tayou has made significant contributions to a number of major international exhibitions and art events around the world. In 2010, he was one of five international artists (El Anatsui, Zarina Bhimji, António Ole, Yinka Shonibare) of African descent selected for the Berlin National Gallery. The Berlin National Gallery is an expression of Germany's past and present history and relationships with the rest of the world. The gallery organised a show titled "Who Knows Tomorrow", inspired by an inscription on a small bus in Africa that was photographed by chance. The statement is an expression of the uncertainty that surrounds the future of humanity. The objective was not to create a representation of African arts, but to install monuments of Germany's colonial past and present relationship with the African continent. Tayou and the four others were selected based on their reflective expression of identity, globalisation and history.

For "Who Knows Tomorrow", Tayou installed 54 African national flags at the Neue Nationalgalerie. This piece, titled "Afrodiziak...Aphrozidiaque...Afrosisiaque", also included several life-size, polychrome sculptures inspired by portraits of Europeans made by African artists during the colonial period. The work arose in response to the creation of the African Union in 2002, and is a representation of African relationships with Europe before and after the 19th Century.

In 2015, Pascale Marthine Tayou had his first solo show in London at the Serpentine Galleries.

=== International exhibitions ===
- The Divine Comedy. Heaven, Purgatory and Hell Revisited by Contemporary African Artists (2014) (curated by Simon Njami)
- Documenta 11 (2002)
- Biennials of Istanbul (2003)
- Lyon (2005)
- Venice (2005 and 2009)
- Colorful Maze (1997
- Crazy Nomad (1999)
- Game Station (2002)

=== Museum exhibitions ===
- MACRO (Rome, 2004)
- The S.M.A.K. (Ghent, Belgium, 2004)
- The MARTa Herford (Herford, Germany, 2005)
- The Milton Keynes Gallery (Milton Keynes, UK, 2007)
- The Malmö Konsthall (Malmö, Sweden, 2010)
- The REVURE NOIR (Expressions Contemporaines d'Afrique et du Monde Paris, 2011)
- MUDAM LUXEMBOURG ( Luxembourg, 2011)
- The Serpentine Sackler Gallery (London, UK 2015)
- Musee Africain de Lyon (Lyon, 2015)

=== Other Shows ===
Tayou participated in over 120 group shows between 1995 and 2012, and 21 solo shows between 2001 and 2011. In total, by the end of 2012, Tayou had carried out 144 public exhibitions across the globe, the majority of which were in Europe and the United States.

| Country | Number of Shows |
|---|---|
| Italy | 100 |
| Germany | 22 |
| USA | 15 |
| Belgium | 13 |
| France | 12 |

| Most Exhibited Shows | |
| Institution | Number of Shows |
|---|---|
| Galleria Continua – Beijing, China | 6 |
| Galerie Peter Herrmann, Germany | 6 |
| Espace doual'art, Cameroon | 4 |
| MACRO Museo d'Arte Contemporanea Roma, Italy | 4 |
| Galleria Continua – San Gimignano, Italy | 4 |

| Title | Exhibition | Gallery/Museum | Country/ Town | Year |
|---|---|---|---|---|
| Black Forest | MUDAM | Musée d'Art Moderne Grand-Duc Jean | Luxembourg | 2011 |
| Transgressions | Galleria Continua | Le Moulin Boissy, le-Châtel | France | |
| Gallery Continua | Gallery Continua | San Gimignano | Italy | |
| Always all ways | Musée d'Art Contemporary | Lyon | France | |
| Transgressions | Galleria Continua | San Gimignano | Italy | 2010 |
| Malmö Konsthall | Malmö | | Sweden | |
| Kiosk Royal | Kiosk, Gent | | Belgium | 2008 |
| Jungle Fever | Gallery Continua | San Gimignano | Italy | 2008 |
| Milton Keynes | Milton Keynes Gallery | Buckingham-shire | United Kingdom | 2007 |

== Bibliography ==
- Simon Njami, Lucy Durán (2007). Africa Remix: Contemporary Art of a Continent. Johannesburg: Jacana Media Pty.
- Pascale Marthine Tayou; Nicolas Bourriaud; Pier Luigi Tazzi (2009). Pascale Marthine Tayou: le grand sorcier de l'utopie.
- Udo Kittelmann, Chika Okeke-Agulu, Britta Schmitz (2010). Who Knows Tomorrow. publisher: Distributed Art Pub Incorporated. ISBN 3865607896, 9783865607898.
- Pensa, Iolanda (Ed.) 2017. Public Art in Africa. Art et transformations urbaines à Douala /// Art and Urban Transformations in Douala. Genève: Metis Presses. ISBN 978-2-94-0563-16-6

== See also ==
- La Colonne Pascale
- List of public art in Douala
