= Myriam Ullens =

Belgian entrepreneur (1952–2023)

Baroness Myriam Ullens
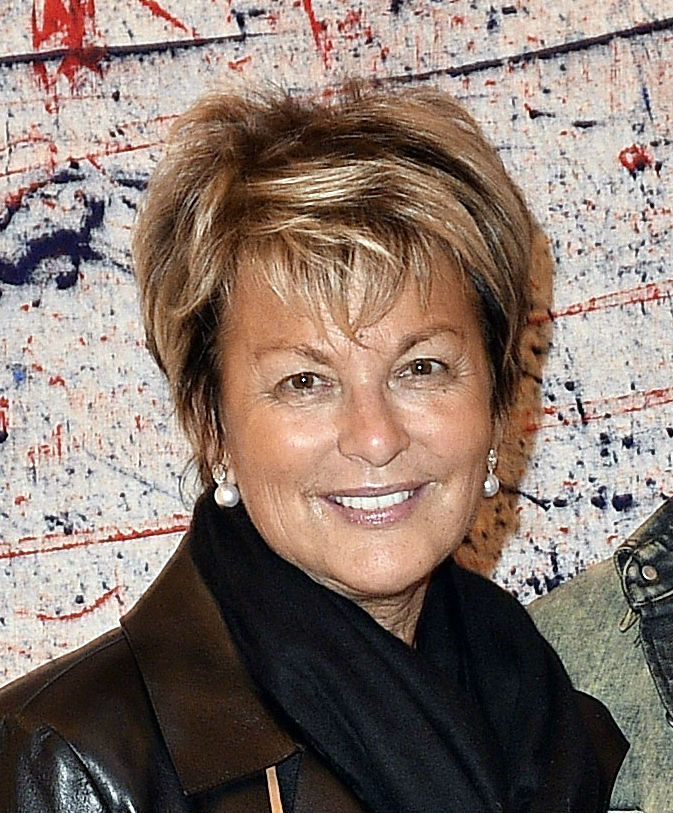
- Ullens in 2014
- Born: Myriam Lechien; 23 September 1952; Cologne, North Rhine-Westphalia, West Germany
- Died: 29 March 2023 (aged 70); Lasne, Belgium
- Occupation: Businesswoman
- Spouse(s): Roger Lemaire (m. 1970, divorced) Christian de Moffarts (m. 1987, divorced) Baron Guy Ullens (m. 1999)
- Children: 2
- Website: http://www.myriamullens.com

Baroness Myriam Ullens de Schooten Whettnall (née Lechien; 23 September 1952 – 29 March 2023) was a Belgian entrepreneur engaged in art, fashion, and philanthropy.

== Early life and education ==
Myriam Ullens was born in Cologne, West Germany, on 23 September 1952. She spent her childhood in the country where her father was an officer in the Belgian Forces in Germany. When she turned five, she moved to a boarding school in Belgium and studied in Namur, and then in Liège.

== Early business ==
At the age of 24, Ullens launched her first business "La Petite Salade", a salad delivery service that she sold four years later.

Immediately thereafter, she created a professional pastry shop named "Sweetly" in Brussels.

In 1991, she met her future husband, Baron Guy Ullens, a Belgian businessman, and shortly thereafter she sold Sweetly in order to devote her time to non-profit organizations.

== Foundations ==
=== Education ===
Ullens built institutions to support Nepal's disadvantaged children, including two orphanages focused on helping children suffering from malnutrition. She founded with her husband Guy Ullens the Ullens School in Lalitpur, the first school in Nepal to offer the International Baccalaureate Diploma Programme.

=== Mimi Ullens Foundation ===
After surviving breast cancer, Ullens recognised a need for patients to refocus on their physical and mental well-being while being treated in hospitals. In 2006, she founded the Mimi Ullens Foundation to support seven centres that are located within the oncology departments of its partner hospitals. These centres provide 15,000 cancer patients with psychological support.

=== Art ===
The Ullens Center for Contemporary Art (UCCA) is an independent, not-for-profit art center serving a global Beijing public. It was founded by Guy and Myriam Ullens in November 2007.

On 11 February 2017, the Ullens Center for Contemporary Art received the 2016 Global Fine Art Awards for Best Contemporary / Postwar / SoloArtist “Rauschenberg in China”.

Ullens sat on the board of trustees of The Royal Drawing School, which was founded by the then Prince of Wales to provide a space where expert teachers could help students with part-time drawing courses each year for adults and children of all ages and abilities.

== Maison Ullens ==
In 2009, Ullens launched her own fashion label, named Maison Ullens.

== Writer ==
Ullens published her first novel, Distant Starless Nights, in February 2017.

== Personal life and death ==
Ullens was married three times. She married Belgian soldier Roger Lemaire when she was 18 and divorced when she was in her mid-20s. They had two children, Gilles Lemaire and Virginie Degryse. Her second marriage was to Christian de Moffarts, a conference planner. She was married to Baron Guy Ullens de Schooten Whettnall since 1999. Her son Gilles is the partner of Reem Kherici, with whom they had a son in 2019.

On 29 March 2023, Myriam Ullens was shot and killed in front of her home in Lasne. She was 70. Her stepson, Nicolas Ullens de Schooten Whettnall (born 1965), was arrested and is under investigation for the murder.
