= Guy Ullens =

Belgian art collector (1935–2025)

Baron Guy Ullens
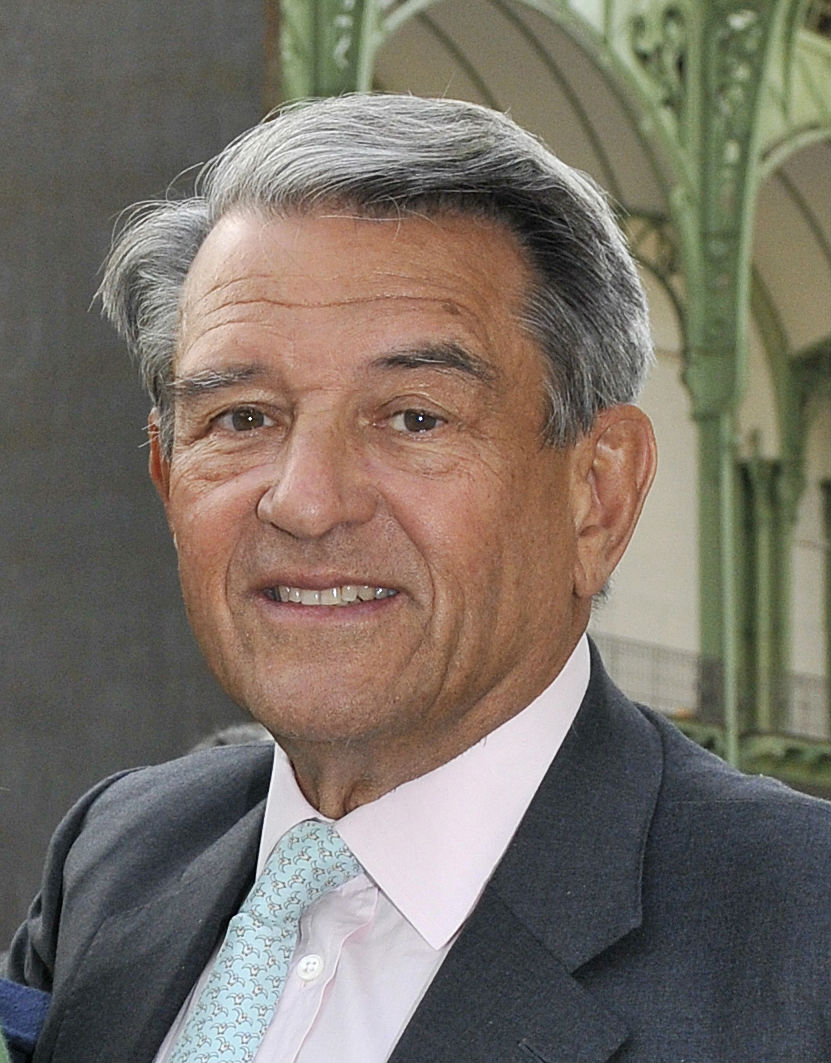
- Ullens in 2014
- Born: Guy François Édouard Marie Ullens de Schooten Whettnall; 31 January 1935; San Francisco, California, U.S.
- Died: 19 April 2025 (aged 90); Ohain, Belgium
- Occupations: Businessman; art collector; investor; philanthropist
- Spouse: Micheline Franckx (m. 1955; div. 1999) Myriam Lechien (m. 1999; died 2023)
- Children: 4

Baron Guy François Édouard Marie Ullens de Schooten Whettnall (31 January 1935 – 19 April 2025) was a Belgian art collector, philanthropist, and businessperson.

Following his business career, Ullens and his wife Myriam established the Guy & Myriam Ullens Foundation. He is also known for the Ullens Center for Contemporary Art in Beijing, and for having founded the Ullens School in Lalitpur, Nepal.

== Early life ==
Guy Ullens was born in San Francisco, California, as the third child to Baron Jean Marie Joseph Anne Mathilde Alphonse Ullens de Schooten Whettnall (1897–1950), a Belgian diplomat, and a member of the Ullens noble family of the Southern Netherlands. His mother was ethnographic photographer, writer, and Royal Geographical Society fellow, Baroness Marie Thérèse Pauline Francis Ullens de Schooten Whettnall née Wittouck (1905–89), of the Belgium noble family Wittouck, a daughter of distilling and sugar magnate Félix Wittouck, who together with his brothers Franz and Paul Wittouck owned the Sugar refinery of Tienen.

The family moved to Oslo, Norway, shortly after Guy was born, where Jean Ullens took up the diplomatic position of acting Minister for Belgium. Over the course of World War II, the family was confined to Berlin, and later lived in India, Pakistan, and Iran.

== Education and career ==
After taking a degree in law from the Catholic University of Louvain, Belgium, in 1958, Ullens obtained an MBA at Stanford University in 1960. He started Eurocan in Mechelen, Belgium, a company that specialized in the manufacture of metal packagings for preserved foods and beverages.

In 1973, he joined the management of the family company R. T. Holding, a conglomerate in food industries, and played as CEO a central role in the company's expansion into Asia. In 1989, the Raffinerie Tirlemontoise was sold to German company Südzucker in a €1 billion deal. Proceeds from the sale were reinvested in food businesses via the holding company Artal Group, for which Ullens served as president and CEO. In 1999, following a change in strategy, Artal entered the textile industry buying French company Albert, and took control of Weight Watchers International in a US$735 million 1980s-style leveraged buyout in September 1999 buying from Heinz 94% of Weight Watchers' equity. Artal Group subsequently earned US$3.8 billion by selling stocks while retaining a 52% majority stake in Weight Watchers. Ullens told Forbes in 2012, that the initial US$224 million direct investment in Weight Watchers had returned US$5.2 billion to Artal Group.

== Philanthropic projects ==
In 2000, Guy Ullens retired from business to devote himself to philanthropic projects with his wife, Myriam Ullens. In 2002 they set up the Guy & Myriam Ullens Foundation. One of the first purposes of the Foundation was to sponsor and organize exhibitions of Chinese art, and to lend pieces to museums and cultural centres around the world. Guy and Myriam Ullens helped children in Nepal by establishing orphanages and two intensive care centres for children with malnutrition. They also set up the Ullens School Kathmandu, partnering with the Bank Street College of Education to train Nepalese teachers. The Ullens School Kathmandu is the only school in Nepal to be IB certified. When Myriam Ullens was diagnosed with cancer in 2003, Guy Ullens took over the development of the Nepal project.

== Art collection ==
In the early 1980s, Ullens initiated a collection of Chinese art that is one of the world's largest and by 2007 included nearly 1,700 pieces. The Ullens Collection is managed by the Guy and Myriam Ullens Foundation.

In 2007, the Foundation established the Ullens Center for Contemporary Art (UCCA) in the Dashanzi district of Beijing. In order to establish UCCA, Ullens sold off his collection of J. M. W. Turner watercolour paintings for £10.76 million at a Sotheby's auction in London in July 2007.

In a Sotheby's Hong Kong auction in April 2011, exclusively featuring 106 works from the Ullens Collection, Zhang Xiaogang's 1988 triptych oil work Forever Lasting Love, of half-naked figures in an arid landscape suffused with mystical symbols, sold for HK$79 million (US$10.1 million), a record auction price for a contemporary artwork from China, in Hong Kong.

In October 2013, Sotheby's Hong Kong at the Asian Contemporary 40th Anniversary Sale, Ullens put up for sale Chen Yifei's political realist work Red Flag 1 (1971), and The Last Supper (2001) by contemporary Chinese artist Zeng Fanzhi. The Last Supper was sold for US$23.3 million, setting a new record for contemporary Asian artwork.

In 2016, Ullens, then in his 80s, announced that he was looking to hand over the UCCA and would sell his art collection at auction.

On 11 February 2017, the Ullens Center for Contemporary Art received the 2016 Global Fine Art Awards for Best Contemporary / Postwar / SoloArtist "Rauschenberg in China".

== Personal life and death ==
Ullens married Micheline Franckx (1932–2015) in 1955 and divorced in 1999. They had four children, three sons Philippe, Yves, Nicolas, and a daughter Brigitte. In 1999, Ullens married Myriam "Mimi" Lechien (1952–2023), a Belgian entrepreneur. Since her shooting death in 2023, his son, Nicolas, has been under investigation for the homicide.

Ullens was a yachtsman, and owned the 170 ft (51.77 m) long flybridge aluminium sloop Red Dragon II with interior design by French architect Jean-Michel Wilmotte. Built by Alloy Yachts in New Zealand in 2007 and commissioned in 2008, the yacht was put up for sale for US$28 million in 2015.

Ullens lived in Verbier in south-western Switzerland in the canton of Valais, where he was a member of the Verbier Festival foundation, and was, according to Het Laatste Nieuws, worth an estimated €250–330 million in 2012.

Ullens died at the age of 90 on 19 April 2025.

== Honours ==
Ullens was appointed Officer and Commander of the Legion of Honour on 4 June 2003 and 1 February 2010 respectively, and Commander of the Order of Leopold II on 5 October 2011.
