= LEO XU Projects =

Art gallery in Shanghai, China

LEO XU Projects is a contemporary art gallery based in Shanghai exhibiting young and international artists.

== The gallery ==
Leo Xu Projects is the eponymous gallery founded by Leo Xu in 2011. It is housed in a three-story building in Shanghai's former French Concession, near the intersection of West Fuxing Road and Wulumuqi Road. It represents a younger generation of artists from China and overseas who experiment with a variety of media. The group focuses on the language of urbanism, architecture and new cinema and strives to explore how such vocabularies have inflected the visual culture of modern China. Leo Xu Projects is envisioned as a platform for artistic experiments that investigate and explore through the aesthetic lens the phenomenon of Shanzhaiism, namely bootleg culture, in the contemporary Chinese society. It also takes special interest in artworks that discuss and examine Chinese diaspora in other parts of the world and how such changing demographics have come to reshape the cultural landscape of the country.

== Exhibition ==
The gallery space was inaugurated by a grand group exhibition, Sweet Dreams (Are Made of This), which featured a roster of artists from China and abroad, including Liu Wei, Liang Yuanwei, Cheng Ran, Chen Wei, Gabriel Lester, and Sun Xun.

Subsequent exhibitions included a series of solo exhibitions by young Chinese artists, such as Cheng Ran (Cheng Ran: What Why Now), Chen Wei (Chen Wei: More), Liu Chuang (Liu Chuang: Works #16-21), Michael Lin (Michael Lin: Shanghai Daily), Cui Jie (Cui Jie), and Guo Hongwei (Guo Hongwei: Editing).

Two group exhibitions have also been held at the venue, Cui Jie, Li Shurui, Zhang Jungang & Li Jie and Boy: A Contemporary Portrait. The former, featuring works by the Beijing-based Cui Jie and Li Shurui and Harbin-based duo Zhang Jungang & Li Jie, provided a visual narrative of the relationship between the artists' lives and the contemporary landscape. The latter portrayed and explored the concept of masculinity while surveying the cultures, sub-cultures and ideologies that have been instrumental in defining young men in the first decade of the 21st century. Boy: A Contemporary Portrait presents works produced by a group of artists who work with diverse media, including the French choreographer Jérôme Bel, video artist Cheng Ran, Guo Hongwei, Hu Xiangqian, Li Qing, Liu Chuang, fashion photographer Mei Yuangui, Wolfgang Tillmans, Fred Tomaselli, Apichatpong Weerasethakul, Danh Vo, Yang Fudong and Zhou Haiying.

== Off-site projects ==
Leo Xu Projects also collaborates with other institutions and organizations on off-site projects, including Voyage: Recent Videos by Young Chinese Artists at ShContemporary Art Fair 2011, ArtistTalk: Apichatpong Weerasethakul and Artist Talk: Timespace by Gabriel Lester at Rockbund Art Museum in Shanghai, and Shanghai Surprise, a project realized through the collective effort of Leo Xu and Azure Wu that comprises two parts: a group exhibition featuring young Chinese and expat authors who boast a close affiliation with the city in either geographical or cultural terms, and a mobile library that captures Shanghai's transforming cultural landscape.

Leo Xu Projects also contributed to Michael Lin's solo exhibition Model Home: A Proposition by Michael Lin, mounted at Shanghai Rockbund Art Museum in the spring of 2012. The exhibition was intended as a response to the Bauhaus contention that architecture should serve as a vehicle through which multiple forms of art, including architecture, painting and sculpture, are combined and integrated as a single unity. The show was realized through the collective effort by Michael Lin and several other artists. Cheng Ran produced a ten-channel video installation that incorporates a documentary of the making of Lin's Model Home, as well as footage on the architectural environment and people. Dutch artist Gabriel Lester gave a talk on the relationship between time and space as part of the exhibition program. Leo Xu curated a sound project that extended the exhibition into a subtle soundscape that further facilitates the philosophical rumination over the dynamics between architecture, people, and urban landscape.

== Artists ==
LEO XU Projects represents and collaborates with the following artists:

- aaajiao (Xu Wenkai)
- Chen Wei
- Cheng Ran
- Cui Jie
- Gabriel Lester
- Guo Hongwei
- Li Qing
- Li Shurui
- Liu Chuang
- Liu Shiyuan
- Michael Lin
- Pixy Yijun Liao
- Apichatpong Weerasethakul
- Zhang Jungang & Li Jie

== Art fairs ==
Leo Xu Projects has been present at a number of international art fairs, including SH Contemporary, Frieze New York and Art Basel Hong Kong.

At the Frieze Art Fair in New York in 2013, a selection of works by the Beijing-based artist Liu Chuang was presented, which focus on the indigenous culture of Shenzhen and Guangzhou, a region in south China populated with migrant works. Through installation works, the artist examines and calls into attention the immediate reality of contemporary China, exploring in particular how the notion of Shanzhai - the phenomenon of counterfeiting and plagiarism in mass manufacturing and consumption - has infiltrated and inflected the local population and their ideological landscape.

At Art Basel HK 2013, Leo Xu Projects premiered a photography-based project by the Beijing-based artist Chen Wei that investigates the youth culture of mainland China - music and lifestyle in particular. This series, set primarily on club dance-floors or at party scenes, aims to capture the moment of trance from the life of Chinese youth, who grow up in the post-89 years and are heavily influenced by imported and unlicensed cultural products such as bootlegged music cassettes, CDs, DVDs, unofficially translated literature and art publications.
