= 0xCollection =

Art institution

The 0xCollection (pronounced "hex collection") is a contemporary art institution based in Basel, Switzerland, dedicated to the collection, exhibition, research and preservation of digital, new media, and time-based art. Through exhibitions, commissions, and collaborations with cultural institutions, it supports artistic practices at the intersection of art, technology, and research.

Founded in 2023 by Czech entrepreneur and philanthropist Karel Komárek, 0xCollection has presented exhibitions and commissions internationally, including projects in Prague, Washington DC, and Basel.

In 2024, the 0xCollection partnered with the Kennedy Center in Washington DC, USA to present the federal institution's first digital art exhibition.

The institution's name derives from the hexadecimal colour coding system used in computing and digital media.

== History ==
0xCollection was founded in Basel in 2023 by Karel Komárek. Curator and cultural strategist Elle Anastasiou served as director of the institution.

The first artwork to be acquired by the collection was by Turkish-American artist Refik Anadol. The data sculpture, Dvořák Dreams, followed a 2 year commission process including research supported by the 0xCollection. Its initial presentation was on the occasion of the Dvořák Prague International Music Festival, at the UNESCO-listed Rudolfinum in Prague, Czech Republic.

The inaugural exhibition by the 0xCollection, Synthetic Immersion, included additional artists, including Ryoji Ikeda, Carsten Nicolai, LuYang, Libby Heaney, Nancy Baker Cahill, Sougwen Chung, QUAYOLA, and Daito Manabe. The exhibition was curated as an examination of synesthesia, the neurological state in which one sense is perceived by another, and the possibility of new media art to provide immersive experiences for art audiences.

The Institution produced a landmark collaboration with the federal John F. Kennedy Center for the Performing Arts in late 2024 - marking both the collection's US debut and the Center's first digital art exhibition.

Since 2025, 0xCollection's curatorial programme has been directed by Viola Lukács, Director of Curatorial Affairs, with exhibitions structured around annual thematic frameworks.

== Collection and exhibitions ==
The 0xCollection specialises in the collection and display of new media art, including video installations, sound installations and multimedia sculpture. Works in the collection include contributions by both blue-chip and emerging artists.

Each of exhibitions feature a select capsule of works, grouped around a curatorial theme. Pieces from the collection are also loaned to public institutions, including the Kennedy Center in 2024.

The institution works with an international network artists, technologists and curators, in addition to support personnel.
