= Cheng Ran =

Cheng Ran is the name of:

- Cheng Ran (rower) (born 1977), Chinese rower
- Cheng Ran (artist) (born 1981), Chinese artist
- Cheng Ran (gymnast) (born 1991), Chinese gymnast who won a gold medal at the 2014 World Artistic Gymnastics Championships
