= Myrvold =

Myrvold is a surname. Notable people with this name include:

- Anders Myrvold (born 1975), Norwegian ice hockey player
- Lasse Myrvold (1953–2006), Norwegian musician and composer
- Pia Myrvold, Norwegian designer of interactive art installations
- Wendy Myrvold, Canadian mathematician and computer scientist
