= Cui Jie =

Cui Jie may refer to:

- Cui Jie (artist) (born 1983), Chinese artist
- Cui Jie (tennis) (born 1998), Chinese tennis player
