= Amira Gad =

Amira Gad (Arabic: أميرة جاد) is an art curator, writer, and editor in modern and contemporary art and architecture. She's currently Curator of Modern & Contemporary Art at Museum Boijmans van Beuningen. Previously, she was Curator at Large (Arts Technologies) at KANAL - Centre Pompidou in Brussels, Head of Programs at LAS Art Foundation in Berlin (2020-2023), curator at the Serpentine Galleries in London (2014-2020), and Kunstinstituut Melly in Rotterdam (2009-2014). She's Egyptian, born in France and grew up in Saudi Arabia.

== Career ==
At LAS, she curated exhibitions by Ian Cheng, Libby Heaney, an app by Judy Chicago and her program also included a series of dance performances by Sharon Eyal & Gai Behar (curated by Claude Adjil), an exhibition by Jakob Kudsk Steensen (curated by Emma Enderby), kickstarted Alexandra Daisy Ginsberg's Pollinator Pathmaker garden at Berlin's Natural History Museum as well as LAS Online, a series of digital commissions.

Gad worked as a curator at the Serpentine Galleries in London from 2014 to 2019. She curated exhibitions of work (and edited the accompanying publications) by artists Arthur Jafa (2017), Lynette Yiadom-Boakye (2016), Jimmie Durham (2015), and Hito Steyerl (2019) amongst others.

Her exhibition of Arthur Jafa's work ‘A Series of Utterly Improbable, Yet Extraordinary Renditions’ (co-curated with Hans Ulrich Obrist) toured to the Julia Stoschek Collection (Berlin, 2018), Galerie Rudolfinum in Prague and the Moderna Museet in Stockholm (2019).

Sondra Perry's 2018 Serpentine Galleries exhibition ‘Typhoon Coming On’ traveled to the Institute of Contemporary Art in Miami while the Torbjørn Rødland exhibition ‘The Touch That Made You’ she curated in 2017 toured to the Fondazione Prada Osservatorio in Milan.

Alongside working on exhibitions of modern and contemporary art, Gad was the curator working on the public commission by Lee Ufan installed in Kensington Gardens in 2018, as well as part of the selection committee that appointed Japanese architect Junya Ishigami for the 2019 Serpentine Pavilion and the curator on Serpentine 2016 architecture programme that presented Bjarke Ingels Group (BIG), Asif Khan, Kunlé Adeyemi (NLE), Yona Friedman, and Barkow Leibinger.

From 2009 to 2014, Gad was Managing Curator and Publications at Witte de With Center for Contemporary Art in Rotterdam. In her time at the institution, she curated exhibitions and public programs including the show ‘Short Big Drama’ with artist Angela Bulloch (co-curated with Nicolaus Schafhausen in 2012), ‘The Temptation of AA Bronson’ (2014) and the 2-day conference I AM FOR AN ART CRITICISM THAT… held at Witte de With Center for Center for Contemporary Art and Stedelijk Museum Amsterdam curated with the-then artistic director Defne Ayas.

== Selected exhibitions ==
- Ian Cheng: Life After BOB (2022)
- Libby Heaney: Ent- (2022)
- Judy Chicago Rainbow AR (2020)
- Albert Oehlen (2019)
- Hito Steyerl: Power Plants (2019) (curated with Ben Vickers, Kay Watson, and Amal Khalaf)
- Sondra Perry: Typhoon Coming On (2018)
- Abdulnasser Gharem and Heimo Zobernig: Subversive Forms of Social Sculpture (2018)
- Torbjørn Rødland: The Touch That Made You (2017)
- Arthur Jafa: A Series of Utterly Improbable, Yet Extraordinary Things (co-curated with Hans Ulrich Obrist), 2017-ongoing
- John Latham: A World View, 2017
- Zaha Hadid: Early Paintings and Drawings (co-curated with Hans Ulrich Obrist), 2016
- Helen Marten: Drunk Brown House, 2016
- Angela Bulloch and Maria Zerres: Considering Dynamics and the Forms of Chaos, 2016
- HACK SPACE (co-curated with Hans Ulrich Obrist), 2016
- Simon Denny: Products for Organising, 2015
- Jimmie Durham: Various Items and Complaints, 2015
- Lynette Yiadom-Boakye: Verses After Dusk, 2015
- Julio Le Parc: Drawings and Games, 2014
- Reiner Ruthenbeck, 2014
- Blue Times (co-curated with Nicolaus Schafhausen), 2014
- The Temptation of AA Bronson (curated by AA Bronson, organised together with Defne Ayas), 2013
- Angela Bulloch: Short Big Drama (co-curated with Nicolaus Schafhausen), 2012

== Other activities ==
Gad is a regular guest lecturer at Sotheby's Institute of Art in London and other art schools in addition to giving talks, leading masterclasses and workshops such as Frieze Academy's day-long event ‘How to Curate an Exhibition’.

== Bibliography ==
- Albert Oehlen (2020)
- Lee Ufan: The Art of Encounter (editor, Serpentine Galleries, Koenig Books and Lisson Gallery, 2019)
- Sondra Perry: Typhoon Coming On (editor, Serpentine Galleries and Koenig Books, 2018)
- Torbjørn Rødland: The Touch That Made You (editor, Serpentine Galleries and Koenig Books, 2018)
- Arthur Jafa: A Series of Utterly Impossible, Yet Extraordinary Renditions (editor, Serpentine Galleries and Koenig Books, 2018)
- John Latham: A World View (editor and writer, Serpentine Galleries and Koenig Books, 2017)
- Zaha Hadid: Early Paintings and Drawings (editor, Serpentine Galleries and Koenig Books, 2016)
- HACK SPACE (editor, Serpentine Galleries and K11 Art Foundation, 2016)
- Helen Marten: Drunk Brown House (editor, Serpentine Galleries and Koenig Books, 2016)
- Angela Bulloch & Maria Zerres: Considering Dynamics and the Forms of Chaos (editor, Sternberg Press & Sharjah Art Museum, 2016)
- Serpentine Pavilion and Summer Houses (editor, Serpentine Galleries and Koenig Books, 2016)
- Simon Denny: Products for Organising (editor and writer, Serpentine Galleries and Koenig Books, 2015)
- Jimmie Durham: Various Items and Complaints (editor, Serpentine Galleries and Koenig Books, 2015)
- Lynette Yiadom-Boakye: Verses After Dusk (editor and writer, Serpentine Galleries and Koenig Books, 2015)
- Willem de Rooij, Character is Fate: Piet Mondrian’s Horoscopes (editor, Witte de With Publishers, 2015)
- The Crime Was Almost Perfect (editor, Sternberg Press and Witte de With Publishers, 2014)
- Erik van Lieshout, HOME: Rotterdam Zuid (editor, Witte de With Publishers, 2014)
- Morality in Fragments (editor, Witte de With Publishers, 2014)
- Lidwien van de Ven: Rotterdam – Sensitive Times (editor, Witte de With Publishers, 2013)
- Angela Bulloch: Source Book 10 (editor, Witte de With Publishers, 2012)
- Tariq Ramadan: On Super-Diversity (Copy-Editor, Witte de WIth Publishers and Sternberg Press, 2012)
- Miki Kratsman: All about us (assistant editor, Sternberg Press and Ursula Blickle Foundation, 2011)

== Awards and honours ==
- Nomination for Women Leading the Art World, UK (The Sunday Times)
- Winner of the 2019 Richard Schlagman Art Book Award in the category Outstanding Artist's Book
- Winner of the AICA Award 2018: Exhibition of the Year, Germany
- Winner of the Sky Arts Awards 2016: Visual Arts Category, UK
- Winner of the Best Dutch Book Design 2015, The Netherlands
- Winner of the AICA Awards 2014: Exhibition of the Year, The Netherlands
