= Yijun Liao =

Chinese artist

Pixy Liao (Yijun Liao)
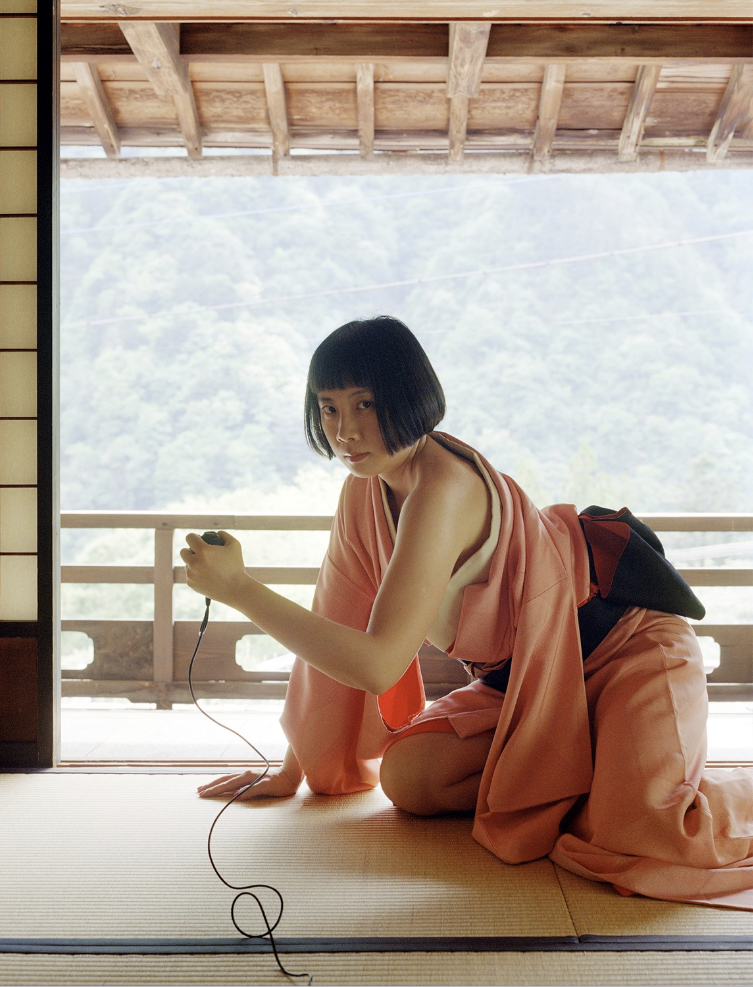
- "The Woman Who Clicks The Shutter, 2018"
- Born: Shanghai, China
- Education: University of Memphis
- Known for: Photography, art
- Notable work: Experimental Relationship
- Awards: NYFA Fellowship in photography, Santo Foundation Individual Artist Awards, Jimei x Arles International Photo Festival Madame Figaro Women Photographers Award, Enfoco New Works Awards Fellowship, LensCulture Exposure Awards, etc

Yijun Liao, also known as Pixy Liao, is a Chinese-American photographer based in Tokyo.

== Biography ==
Liao was born in Shanghai. She received an MFA in photography from the University of Memphis in 2008. She currently lives and works in Tokyo, Japan.

She has exhibited her work internationally at venues such as the Art Institute of Chicago, Fotografiska, Rencontres d'Arles, the Asia Society, the National Gallery of Australia, and M+ Museum.

She is mostly known for her series Experimental Relationship. The series depicts her with her younger Japanese boyfriend and collaborator, Takahiro Morooka (nicknamed Moro). The elaborate photography depicted challenges gender norms in regards to media and sexual expression. Her photography attempts to change the way society sees nudity and media through the lens of a whole new perspective.

== Exhibitions ==
=== Solo exhibitions ===
- 2008 Experimental Relationship, Adam Shaw Studio, Memphis, TN
- 2011 Memphis, Tennessee, Chinese American Art Council, New York City
- 2013 The Second Story of Two Stories, Kips Gallery, Seoul, Korea
- 2013 Let's Make Love, the Camera Club of New York, New York City
- 2015 Experimental Relationship, Circuitous Succession Gallery, Memphis, TN
- 2016 Some Words are just between Us, curated by Sophia Cai, First Draft Gallery, Sydney, Austra
- 2016 Venus As A Boy, LEO XU Projects, Shanghai, China
- 2017 Lady and Gentleman, Galleri Vasli Souza, Malmö, Sweden
- 2018 Pixy Liao, curated by Roussell, Jimei x Arles International Photo Festival, Xiamen, China
- 2019 Une Relation Expérimentale the Rencontres d'Arles, Arles, France
- 2019 Experimental Relationship Fotografia Europea, Reggio Emilia, Italy
- 2019 Open Kimono Chambers Fine Art, New York City
- 2020 Experimental Relationship (for your eyes only, or maybe mine, too) curated by Henry Lu Centre A, Vancouver, Canada
- 2021 Your Gaze Belongs To Me curated by Holly Roussell, Fotografiska, New York
- 2021 Your Gaze Belongs To Me curated by Holly Roussell, Fotografiska, Stockholm
- 2022 Your Gaze Belongs To Me curated by Holly Roussell, Fotografiska, Tallinn
- 2022 Futari (Two Persons) curated by Mary Lee Hodgens, Light Work, Syracuse, NY
- 2023 Experimental Relationship, Centre for Contemporary Photography, Melbourne, Australia
- 2024 Pixy Liao: Comfort Zone, Blindspot Gallery, Hong Kong
- 2024 Between Us, curated by Sito Rozema, MORE Museum, Gorssel, Netherlands
- 2025 Pixy Liao: Relationship Material, Art Institute of Chicago, Chicago, Illinois

=== Group exhibitions ===
- 2015 Evidence, Format International Photography Festival, Derby, UK
- 2015 No Holds Barred—Young Contemporary Art from China, curated by Boyi Feng and Lars Jonnson, OPEN ART Biennial, Örebro, Sweden
- 2016 The Real Thing, Flowers Gallery, New York City
- 2016 WECHAT - A Dialogue in Contemporary Chinese Art, curated by Barbara Pollack, Asia Society Texas Center, Houston, TX
- 2016 Bagsim, chi K11 Art Museum in Shanghai, Shanghai, China
- 2016 "When We Become Us", Capsule Shanghai
- 2017 NSFW: Female Gaze, Museum of Sex, New York
- 2019 Holly Mosses, curated by Nick Yu, Blindspot Gallery, Hong Kong
- 2020 The Body Electric, curated by Dr Shaune Lakin, National Gallery of Australia, Sydney
- 2020 Home Sweet Home, curated by Julia Reichelt, Kunstforum der TU Darmstadt
- 2022 I have not loved (enough or worked), curated by Rachel Cieśla, Art Gallery of Western Australia, Perth, Australia
- 2022 I LOVED YOU, White Rabbit Gallery, Sydney, Australia *2022 Unmasking Masculinity for the 21st Century, Kalamazoo Institute of Arts, Michigan *2022 Mirror Image: A Transformation of Chinese Identity, curated by Barbara Pollack with Han Hongzheng, Asia Society, New York *2022 CHOSEN FAMILY – LESS ALONE TOGETHER, Fotomuseum Winterthur, Switzerland
- 2023 FAMILY (OF CHOICE). THOSE WHO WE ARE, Kunstmuseum Ravensburg, Germany *2023 Personal: A New Form of Documentary Photography, curated by Karen Smith, Shanghai Center of Photography, Shanghai, China
- 2024 Shanghai: Capital of Photography 1910s - 2020s, curated by Guzheng, Shanghai Minsheng Art Museum, Shanghai, China *2024 Love is Louder, Bozar, Brussels, Belgium *2024 Inside Views – Contemporary Photography from China, WestLicht Photography Museum, Vienna, Austria
- 2025 Tender Comrades, White Rabbit, Sydney, Australia *2025 Picasso for Asia—A Conversation, M+ Museum, Hong Kong *2025 Facial Recognition, curated by Barbara Pollack, Jane Lombard Gallery, New York

== Collections ==
Liao's work is held in the following public collections:

- Alexander Tutsek-Stiftung, Germany
- Art Gallery of Western Australia, Perth * Franklin Furnace Archive, USA
- Fundació Carmen & Lluís Bassat, Spain
- Fundación MEDIANOCHE0, Spain
- Fort Wayne Museum of Arts, Indiana
- He Xiangning Art Museum, China
- Herbert F. Johnson Museum of Art, Ithaca, New York
- Kalamazoo Institute of Arts, Michigan
- Light Work, Syracuse, New York
- M+ Museum, Hong Kong
- Memphis International Airport, Tennessee
- Møllersamlingen, Norway
- Museum of Fine Arts, Houston, Texas
- The Kinsey Institute, USA
- The Center for Fine Art Photography, Fort Collins, Colorado
- The Center for Photography at Woodstock, Kingston, New York
- Vontobel Art Collection, Switzerland
- White Rabbit Collection, Australia
- White Villa Collection, France

== Publications ==
- Experimental Relationship Vol.1 (2007-2017), published by Jiazazhi, 2018
- Pimo Dictionary, published by Jiazazhi, 2018
