= Libby Heaney =

British artist, physicist and lecturer

- Education: Imperial College London; University of Leeds; Central Saint Martins
- Scientific career
- Workplaces: University of Oxford; National University of Singapore; Royal College of Art
- Thesis: Entanglement of non-interacting Bose gases (2008)
- Website: libbyheaney.co.uk

Libby Heaney is a British artist and quantum physicist known for her pioneering work on AI and quantum computing. She works on the impact of future technologies and is widely known to be the first artist to use quantum computing as a functioning artistic medium. Her work has been featured internationally, including in the Victoria and Albert Museum, Tate Modern and the Science Gallery.

== Early life and scientific career ==
Heaney is from Tamworth, Staffordshire. She lived in Amington, and went to Greenacres Primary School and Woodhouse High School, now called Landau Forte Academy Amington. She took her GCSEs in 1999.

She studied physics at Imperial College London, graduating in 2005 with first class honours. Libby pursued a successful career in quantum physics, completing a PhD thesis on mode entanglement in ultra-cold atomic gases at the University of Leeds, and pursued her own research as a postdoctoral fellow at the University of Oxford and at the National University of Singapore. In 2008, Heaney was awarded the Institute of Physics Very Early Career Woman in Physics Award (now Jocelyn Bell Burnell Medal and Prize).

== Artistic career ==
In 2013 Heaney returned to the UK and completed a master's degree at the University of the Arts London. She studied arts and science at Central Saint Martins and graduated in 2015. She then became a lecturer at the Royal College of Art, teaching Information Experience Design. In 2016, she created Lady Chatterley's Tinderbot which presented Tinder conversations between real users and AI bots programmed using Lady Chatterley's Lover. Lady Chatterley's Tinderbot was covered by BBC News, TheJournal.ie and the Irish Examiner and was exhibited internationally.

In 2017, Heaney was commissioned by Sky Arts and the Barbican Centre to design Britbot, an internet bot built using artificial intelligence and the citizenship book Life in the UK: a guide for new residents. The book, a manual for the citizenship test, has been described by Heaney as being "largely a white male privileged version of British history and culture". The bot spoke to the public about what it meant to be British and learnt from their responses to become an ever changing, plural version of Britishness. She was awarded an Arts Council England grant to widen participation of the Britbot to social media. Heaney has exhibited Britbot at the Victoria and Albert Museum, at CogX, the Sheffield Documentary Festival the Edinburgh TV festival, and Art Ai in Leicester.

She has been creating with quantum computing since 2019, and has created artworks using quantum computing for Light Art Space (LAS) in Berlin, Somerset House and arebyte in London. Using quantum code, storytelling, and immersive installations and performances, Libby Heaney's works such as Ent- and slimeqore explore and warn against the double-edged potential of quantum computing and its exploitation by private companies. In 2022, Ent- received the Lumen Prize immersive environment award.

== Major works ==
=== Ent- and The Evolution of Ent-: QX (2022) ===
In 2022, Libby Heaney was commissioned by Light Art Space to create Ent-, a 360 immersive installation that revisits Bosch's Garden of Earthly Delights through quantum. The work uses quantum computing as both a medium and a paradigm through which to conceive human and non-human relations.

Ent- was exhibited at LAS, Ars Electronica, and arebyte gallery in London. The work was also modified to fit a full dome projection at the Deutsches Museum in Munich, projected onto a public facade in Seoul, and turned into a playable version for an exhibition at Nahmad Contemporary in New York.

In 2022, Ent- was a winner in the Art Science Category of the Falling Walls prize and received the Lumen Prize immersive environment award.

The Evolution of Ent-:QX, first displayed at arebyte gallery in London, builds on Ent- and imagines a fictional quantum computing company (QX) that appropriates, parodies and subverts the language of big tech in order to educate the viewer on current profit-oriented uses of quantum computing as well as propose new ways to think about and use the technology.

In 2023, Ent- was acquired and displayed by the 0xCollection, a new media arts institution based in Basel, in their inaugural exhibition in Prague.

=== Touch is response-ability (2020) ===
Touch is response-ability is an instagram performance and touch screen installation where participants activate animations by flicking through instagram stories. The performance investigates representations of the female body in art history and through computer vision to see how stereotypes are socially constructed and maintained. Images of the body are passed through a quantum algorithm, and as the users interact with them they progressively become fragmented and dissolve beyond recognition.

The work was originally commissioned by Hervisions at LUX in 2020 and performed on the LUX instagram account. It was also exhibited at Etopia Zaragoza in 2021 and at Art SG with Gazelli Art House in 2023.

=== Lady Chatterley's Tinderbot (2016) ===
In Lady Chatterley's Tinderbot, Libby Heaney programmed a bot to engage in conversations on Tinder by using lines from the 1928 novel Lady Chatterley's Lover, by D.H. Lawrence. The work was first shown as an interactive installation in 2016 at the Dublin Science Gallery, allowing visitors to swipe left or right to navigate through various conversations.

Lady Chatterley's Tinderbot was also exhibited at Sonar+D in Barcelona (2017), the Telefonica Fundacion in Lima (2017), the Lowry in Salford (2018), RMIT gallery in Melbourne (2021), Microwave Festival in Hong Kong (2022) and was shortlisted for the HEK-Basel Net-based art award in 2018.

== Selected exhibitions ==
- 2023 – Synesthetic Immersion, 0xCollection, Prague
- 2023 – slimeQrawl, Shoreditch Arts Club, London
- 2023 – ...and that's only (half) the story, PLUS ONE Gallery, Antwerp
- 2023–Present Futures Festival, Centre of Contemporary Art, Glasgow
- 2023 – Realtime: Lilypads: Mediating Exponential Systems, NXT Museum, Amsterdam
- 2023 – My Rhino is not a Myth, Art Encounters Biennial, Timisoara
- 2023 – Ent-er the Garden of Forking Paths, Gazelli Art House, London
- 2023 – Energeia, Etopia, Zaragoza
- 2022 – Every Kind of Wind: Calder and the 21st Century, Nahmad Contemporary, New York
- 2022 – remiQXing still, Fiumano Clase, London
- 2022 – the Evolution of Ent-: QX, arebyte, London
- 2022 – Ent-, Light Art Space x Schering Stiftung, Berlin
- 2022 – Among the Machines, Zabludowicz Collection, London
- 2022 – BioMedia, ZKM, Karlsruhe
- 2021 – CASCADE, Southbank Centre, London
- 2021 – Agency is the Ability to Act, Holden Gallery, Manchester
- 2021 – BIAS, Science Gallery, Dublin
- 2021 – Ars Electronica, Linz
- 2021 – AI & Music, S+T+ARTS & Sonar Festival, CCCB, Barcelona
- 2020 – Real Time Constraints, arebyte, London
- 2019 – Euro(re)visions, Goethe Institut, London
- 2019 - Higher Resolutions with Hyphen Labs, Tate Modern, London
- 2019 – Open Fest with Sky Arts, Barbican, London
- 2018 – Digital Design Weekend, V&A, London
- 2018 – FAKE, Science Gallery, Dublin
- 2017 – Ars Electronica, Linz
- 2017 – Entangled: Quantum Computer Art, Royal College of Art, London
- 2017 – Humans Need Not Apply, Science Gallery, Dublin

== Awards and honours ==
Her awards include:

- 2022 – Lumen Prize, BCS Immersive Environment Award (for Ent-)
- 2022 – Mozilla Foundation Creative Media Award, USA
- 2022 – nominated for the S+T+ARTS prize
- 2021 – Adaptation Award, Artquest, London
- 2021 – British Council Amplify Collaboration Award
- 2018 – Arts Council England, National Lottery Project Grant
- 2018 – HeK Basel Net Based Art Award (shortlisted for Tinderbot)
