= Li Qing (artist) =

Chinese artist (born 1981)

Li Qing (born 1981) is a Chinese artist based in Hangzhou, Zhejiang Province, China.

== Life ==
Li was born in the Zhejiang province. Li attended the China Academy of Art, graduating from the Oil Painting department in 2004.

== Style ==
Li Qing's main medium is oil painting on canvas. He has also worked with photography.

He is a painter whose work confronts issues surrounding visual perception – his Point Out The Differences series consists of pairs of paintings based on the same image, into which Li inserts a number of differences not immediately obvious to the viewer. Li is part of a generation of Chinese artists increasingly informed by the images and history of Western culture. Li Qing has brought his experience from the exploration of painting language to new mediums (2010 video Drift Poetry of feathers floating through the air inside a down-coat factory).

=== Works ===
In 2002, as a student in the China Academy of Art, Li was looking for a way to make painting into a more spiritual experience and not only an aesthetic experience. He created the work named "2002 – Keen Experience 1." He described this work in his thesis paper:

"Post Enlightenment science and reason did not resolve the chronic illness of the human spirit as people had hoped; that illness was rooted in the limitations of the human body and life, and resulted in emptiness and absurdity in existential values. Only transcendental methods such as religion and philosophy could lead man to spiritual limitlessness, and solve the problems of death and the body and soul. Art is also one of those methods. Intellectual art uses the fabrication and illumination of multiple times and spaces to dispel the pressure that is brought on man by limitlessness and death, and to complete the expansion of the individual life. As painting is an art form directed at the eternal, it must bear the weight of this problem....I yearn to engage in a form of painting practice that can carry ideas and the spirit, and avoids the dead end of painting serving only as the subject of aesthetic appraisal and consumption."

Li describes himself as having as "computer programmer" approach, based on his series "Finding Differences." This series, which he began in 2005, is inspired by a type of video game where the player finds differences between images. He uses this series to break the normal aesthetic that painting can bring.

In 2006, Li began a series of oil paintings called "Images of Mutual Undoing and Unity," in which Li takes two images and paints them together, so they become one painting. He described this series:

"The works in this series (Images of Mutual Undoing and Unity ) show the audience a process of two forms destroying and melding with each other, where disintegration and reshaping happen together. The changes and disintegration of the markings of the two forms imply that reality is an illusion, like so many people and events appearing in succession through history. Perhaps both the stage and the backstage are false. The famous actors depicted here are everyone’s unverifiable self; we have no way of knowing at what time our selves originated from supposition. Perhaps we completely began with supposition.11 The toughest part is that the two paintings are lost forever. Nothing can be restored. It is like so much spilled milk in life, but it is still worth mourning. The resulting forms are but aren’t; they’re muddled, like so many of our worn memories – a form slowly emerging from the depths of memory. The world of the past is always relegated to decline and amorphousness; some things have left us, some things linger. Is that which lingers longer real? The strange thing is, everything is as expected and nothing is as expected."

== Selected exhibitions ==
=== Solo exhibition ===
==== 2011 ====
- A Note—Fontana in His Later Years, Platform China Space, Beijing, China
- Relative Altitude, Arario Gallery, New York, USA

==== 2010 ====
- Drift, Centro de Artes Tomás y Valiente, Madrid, Spain
- Shattered vision (an addition to Drift), Gao Magee Gallery, Madrid, Spain

==== 2009 ====
- Ghosting, Duolun Museum Of Modern Art, Shanghai, China
- Curtain, Hanart TZ Gallery, Hong Kong, China

==== 2008 ====
- Collision in the Air, DF2 Gallery, Los Angeles, USA
- Ghosting, Iberia Center for Contemporary Art, Beijing, China

==== 2006 ====
- Finding Together, F2 Gallery, Beijing, China

=== Group exhibition ===
==== 2012 ====
- Boy: A Contemporary Portrait, Leo Xu Projects, Shanghai, China

==== 2011 ====
- Surplus Goodlookingness, Tang Contemporary Art Beijing, Beijing, China
- One Man Theatre, He Xiangning Art Museum, Nanshan District Shenzhen, China
- Ramble, F2 Gallery, Beijing, China
- Community of Tastes:Chinese Contemporary Art from 2000, São Paulo Museum of Contemporary Art, São Paulo, Brasil
- ARCO, Madrid, Spain
- Expression of Chinese Contemporary Art, Today Art Museum, Beijing, China
- 19 Solo Shows About Painting, Platform China Contemporary Art Institute, Beijing, China
- Pure Views: New Painting From China, Asian Art Museum of San Francisco, San Francisco, USA
- Painting Lesson I : Illusion or Delusion, Yang Gallery, Beijing, China
- A Wedding, Para/Site Art Space, Hong Kong, China
- Urban Utopia, Deutsche Bank Collection, Hong Kong, China
- Almost Tangible, Arariobeijing Gallery 1, Beijing, China
- Fly Through The Tropo‐Sphere: Memo of The New Generation Painting, Iberia Center for Contemporary Art, Beijing, China
- Chengdu Biennale, Chengdu, China

==== 2010 ====
- Asian Landmark‐Toyota Art Project, Iberia Center for Contemporary Art, Beijing, China
- Jungle: A Close‐up Focus on Chinese Contemporary Art Trends, Platform China Contemporary Art Institute, Beijing, China
- TORA TORA TORA: Chinese Cutting‐Edge Photography Exhibition, Beijing, China
- Here, There ‐ The World in Motion, Li Space, Beijing, China/ Lu Xun Academy of Art, Shenyang, China
- Reshaping History: Chinart from 2000 to 2009, China National Convention Center, Beijing, China
- ARTHK2010, Hong Kong Convention and Exhibition Centre, Hong Kong, China
- Community of Tastes: Chinese Contemporary Art from 2000, Chile Museum of Contemporary Art, Santiago, Chile
- Do You See What I Mean?, Fabien Fryns Fine Art, Los Angeles, USA
- The Personal Dimension: Four Emerging Artists from China, Arario Gallery, New York, USA
- 10 Cases studies of Post‐70s Art, Hong Kong Exhibition Centre, Hong Kong, China
- Pure Views: New Painting From China, Louise Blouin Foundation, London, UK

==== 2009 ====
- In the Mood for Paper, F2 Gallery, Beijing, China
- Out Law, Li Space, Beijing, China
- What Has Been Happening Here? – The Inaugural Exhibition of Chinese Independent Film Archive, Iberia Center for Contemporary Art, Beijing, China
- Reflect Light – Depth of New Art, West Lake Art Museum, Hangzhou, China/Wall Art Museum, Beijing, China
- Blade – Reconstruct Leifeng Pagoda, S Z Art Centre, Beijing, China
- Art Beijing 2009 – Artist Cinema, Agricultural Exhibition Center, Beijing, China
- ARTHK08, Hong Kong Convention and Exhibition Centre, Hong Kong, China
- Prague Biennale 4, Prague, Czech
- Textbook: An Exhibition Of Lively Chinese Paintings, Li Space, Beijing, China

==== 2008 ====
- Time-Lag: The New Force of Chinese Contemporary Art, Magee Art Gallery, Madrid, Spain
- Unpack – Chinese Experiment Art, China Academy of Art, Hangzhou, China
- ARTHK08, Hong Kong Convention and Exhibition Centre, Hong Kong, China
- Poetic Realism: An Reinterpretation of Jiangnan – Contemporary Art from South China, Tomás y Valiente Art Centre, Madrid, Spain
- 55 Days in Valencia-Chinese Art Meeting, Institut Valencia d’Art Morden, Valencia, Spain
- China Gold – Chinese Contemporary Art, Museum Maillol, Paris, France
- Case studies of Artists in Art History and Art Criticism, S Z Art Centre, Beijing, China
- Notes of Conception – A Local Narrative of Chinese Contemporary Painting, Iberia Center for Contemporary Art, Beijing, China
- Virtual City – New Power – China Contemporary Art Biennale 2008, Yuangong Art Museum, Shanghai, China
- Asia – the 3d Nanjing triennial, Nanjing Museum, Nanjing, China
- Deep Pond and Float Chamber, Qinghe Museum of Contemporary Art, Nanjing, China
- The Revolution Continues – New Chinese Art, Saatchi Gallery, London, UK
- Chinese Fantasies, Found Museum, Beijing, China
- Game Is Not Over, Arario Gallery, Beijing, China
- Art Asia Miami, Miami, USA

==== 2007 ====
- Time Difference – New Art from China and USA, Initial Access, Wolverhampton, UK
- The Great Yangtze River Bridge, White Canvas Gallery, Nanjing, China
- The First Today’s Documents, Today Art Museum, Beijing, China
- Beyond Image – Chinese New Painting, Shanghai Art Museum, Shanghai, China

==== 2006 ====
- See the luck when raise head, Contemporary Art, Hangzhou
- See the luck when open the door, Wuxi Contemporary Art Exhibition tour, China
- 10+10, Shanghai Zendai Museum of Modern Art, Shanghai
- Beyond Dimension – Chinese New Painting, Square Gallery of Contemporary Art, Nanjing, China
- Potential Dialogue – The Party of Sino-Austria young artists, RCM Museum, Nanjing, China
- Exhibition of Zhejiang young painters & awarded Academy Prize, Zhejiang exhibition center, Hangzhou, China

==== 2005 ====
- Young Chinese Contemporary Art, Hangar-7, Salzburg, Austria
- Archaeology of the Future, 2nd Triennial of Chinese art, Nanjing Museum, Nanjing
- The Spring of Vizcaya: Exhibition of Paintings and Sculptures of Chinese and French Artists, Shanghai
- 2005 Zhejiang Oil-painting exhibition & awarded the Gold Prize, Ningbo Art Museum, Ningbo, China

==== 2004 ====
- Layer After Layer: Contemporary Painting in Shanghai, Zhejiang Exhibition Centre

== Works collected by ==
- China Academy of Art, Hangzhou, China
- Institut Valencià d’Art Morden (IVAM), Valencia, Spain
- International Art & Culture Foundation (IAC) of Spain
- FC MOCA/ Frank Cohen Collection Manchester, UK
- Saatchi Gallery, London, UK
- Hangar-7, Salzburg, Austria
- DSL Foundation, Paris, France
- Kent Logan Foundation, San Francisco, USA
- Shanghai Zendai Museum of Modern Art, Shanghai, China
- Square Museum of Contemporary Art, Nanjing, China
- RCM Museum, Nanjing, China
- Yuangong Art Museum, Shanghai, China

== Artists exhibited with ==
Jérôme Bel, the Luo Brothers (罗氏兄弟), HE Chi, Liu Chuang, Yu Fan, Chen Fei, Yang Fudong, ZHOU Haiying, Guo Hongwei, Zhang Hui, Yu Ji, Ma Jun, Liu Liguo, MA, Chi Peng, SHI Qing, Ma Qiu-sha, Cheng Ran, Wu Rigen, Yang Shuangqing, Liang Shuo, Xu Tan, Wolfgang Tillmans, Fred Tomaselli, Danh Vo, Apichatpong Weerasethakul, Chen Wei, Hu Xiangqian, Mei Yuangui, Ren Zh
