= Liu Chuang (artist) =

Chinese artist

Liu Chuang (刘窗) is a Chinese artist who currently lives and works in Beijing. He was born in 1979 and graduated from Hubei Institute of Fine Arts in 2001.

His work, "Buying Everything on You" was featured in The Generational: Younger Than Jesus exhibition that took place at the New Museum in 2009. The show was curated by Massimiliano Gioni. As part of an ongoing project, "Buying Everything on You" was also on view at Frieze New York 2013, and was presented by the Shanghai-based gallery Leo Xu Projects.

== Exhibitions ==
Solo Exhibitions
Title	Year	Exhibition Type	Venue	Location
Live Remnants	2015	Solo	Magician Space	Beijing, China
Segmented Landscape	2015	Solo	K11 Wuhan	Wuhan, China
Love Story	2014	Solo	Taikang Art Space	Beijing, China
Dancing Partners	2014	Solo	Kunsthall Stavanger	Stavanger, Norway
Love Story	2014	Solo	Salon 94 Freemans	(United States) New York, USA
Liu Chuang: Works #16-21	2012	Solo	Leo Xu Projects	Shanghai, China
51m²: 13# Liu Chuang	2010	Solo	Taikang Space	Beijing, China

=== Group exhibitions ===
Group Exhibitions
Title	Year	Exhibition Type	Venue	Location
Until the End of The World	2012	Group	Tang Contemporary Art Beijing	Beijing, China
La Chambre Claire	2012	Group	Taikang Space	Beijing, China
Boy: A Contemporary Portrait	2012	Group	Leo Xu Projects	Shanghai, China
51m²: 16 Emerging Chinese Artists	2011	Group	Taikang space	Beijing, China
Image History Existence: Taikang Life 15th Anniversary Art Collection Exhibition	2011	Group	National Art Museum Of China	Beijing, China
CAFAM Biennale: Super-organism	2011	Group	CAFA Art Museum	Beijing, China
Moving Image In China: 1988-2011	2011	Group	Minsheng Art Museum	Shanghai, China
Video Wednesdays I	2011	Group	Gallery Espace, Lalit Kala Akadem	New Delhi, India
China Power Station	2010	Group	Pinacoteca Giovanni e Marella Agnelli	Turin, Italy
Studies & Theory	2010	Group	Kwadrat	Berlin, Germany
Trailer	2010	Group	Boers-Li Galler	Beijing, China
The Generational: Younger Than Jesus	2009	Group	New Museum of Contemporary Art	(United States) New York, USA
Permanent Migrant	2009	Group	Inheritance – Shenzhen	Shenzhen, China
Just Around the Corner	2009	Group	Arrow Factory	Beijing, China
Forever Young	2008	Group	Anne+ art project	Paris, France
Insomnia	2008	Group	BizArt Art Center	Shanghai, China
Poznan Mediations	2008	Group	International Biennale Of Contemporary art	Poznan, Poland
Terminu	2008	Group	para/site art space	Hong Kong
There Is No Story To Tell	2008	Group	Tangren Gallery	Beijing, China
Homesickness	2008	Group	T Space	Beijing, China
Delirious Beijing	2008	Group	PKM Gallery	Beijing, China
Realms Of Myth	2008	Group	Shanghai Gallery Of Art	Shanghai, China
China Power Station: Part 2	2007	Group	Astrup Fearnley Museum of Modern Art	Oslo, Norway
In Shenzhen	2007	Group	J&Z Gallery	Shenzhen, China
Slash Fiction	2007	Group	Gasworks	(United Kingdom) London, UK
The 2nd Triennial of Chinese Art: Archaeology Of the Future	2005	Group	The Nanjing Museum	Nanjing, China
Any Place Any Art, Immigration, Utopia	2004	Group	Macedonian Museum of Contemporary Art	Thessaloniki, Greece
The Fifth System: Public Art in the Age of Post-Planning	2003	Group	The 5th Shenzhen International Public Art Exhibition	Shenzhen, China
