= Pia Myrvold =

Norwegian artist (born 1960)

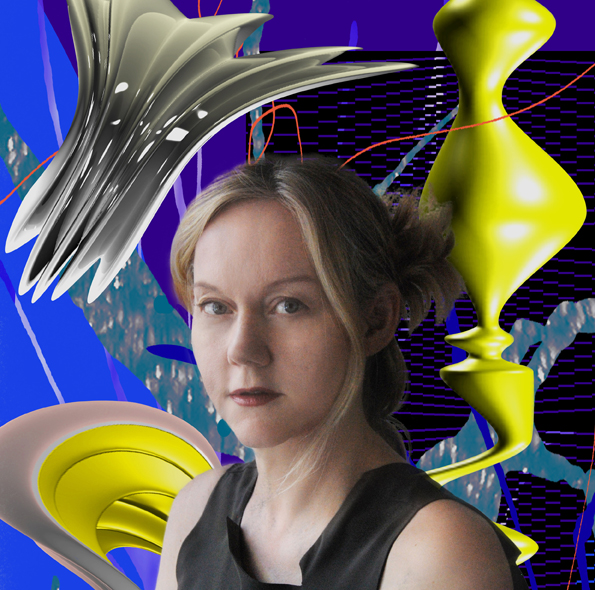
Myrvold

Pia Myrvold (styled as Pia MYrvoLD) is a Norwegian artist and designer specialized in interactive art interfaces. In her work she mixes technology and different artistic media, such as 3D animation, painting, video, fashion and design, in order to build a new relationship between the art, the dissemination of ideas and the public. She lives and works in Paris.

== Early life ==
Pia Myrvold was born in 1960 in Stavanger, Norway. Since 1991 she had been living and working in New York and Paris. In 2003, she founded MYworLD Studio in Paris, dedicated to the research and development of her artistic endeavors.

== Career ==
Myrvold first appeared at the Norwegian art stage at age 20, debuting at Vestlandsutstilingen and the Norwegian National Autumn Exhibition. In 1986, she both organized and participated in Sola International Art Festival. She had since participated in numerous exhibitions, panels and conferences around the world working with many different media, such as painting, sculpture, design, fashion, performance art, installation art and 3D animation.

At a high level, Myrvold's art often focuses on modern life, urban environments and the relationship between the two. Many of her works detail both human emotion and advances in technology.

=== Urban Upwind ===
Her first large scale international breakthrough was in 1992 when, invited by the Swiss architect Bernard Tschumi, Myrvold made a summer installation "Urban Upwind" at the Parc de la Villette in Paris. 2000m of cloth designed by the artist were made into large sculptures and scaffolding in the park connecting Tschumi's Folies.

=== Fashion design and Cybercouture ===
Living in Paris in the 1990s, Myrvold started including fashion as a medium in an interdisciplinary philosophy. In 1994, the official calendar of the French Chambre Syndicale de la Haute Couture invited her to show her projects. Her first collection was made from plastic bags and logos in Paris, called Paris Identity.

In 1995, she had founded "cybercouture", the first interactive design studio on the web, merging art with fashion. With cybercouture.com, users could participate in the elaboration of the clothes design by downloading their favorite art content onto the garments.

Myrvold's "Dada Memomory" collection in 1996 was the first in the world to use smart technology where models would push buttons on the clothes to active sound and image loops.

"Cybercouture"'s genesis resulted from Myrvold's mission to circulate the ideas behind her collections - essential to grasping what each garment represents - simultaneously with the clothes. It also gave her a means of confronting unethical sweatshop conditions and beauty ideals, rather than working within the system that reinforces them. 'My challenge was to have the freedom to design the type of clothes I wanted and compete within the system without promoting its ideals'.

=== "Female Interfaces" ===
In 2004, Myrvold was invited to present the "Female Interfaces" performance at the Centre Georges Pompidou in Paris. The performers were wearing interactive garments that allowed them to activate projected images with the help of the buttons situated inside the clothes. In this way they became the protagonists not only of the physical action, but also of creative thoughts. The interface was also presented in the exhibition "Ecoute", where the same images and sounds could be played with by the public.

=== FLOW - a work in motion ===
For her independent pavilion and solo show in Venice in 2011, parallel to the Venice Biennale, Myrvold chose to present a number of large-scale interactive installations using video screens and 3D animation. One of them, the "Stargate", was composed of a video loop projected on six interconnected screens. An immersive work of art, the public could interact with the installation by stepping inside it.

In the exhibition catalog, director of the Norwegian Art Council Anne Aasheim writes: 'In Venice, Myrvold is showing "FLOW", as a work in progress, or as she explains, 'a work in motion' as it is a constantly changing work that demands the collaboration of technical and financial partners in order to evolve; that grows in scale and technological sophistication as Myrvold connects to new players in the contemporary scene of visual digital experience'

=== Stenersen museum solo show ===
In 2012, Myrvold had an important exhibition in the Stenersen Museum in Oslo. Titled "Pia Myrvold works in motion - new parameters in painting and sculpture", the exhibition featured some of the large-scale installations, such as "Video Spiral" as well as a multitude of animated sculptures and videos.

=== "Metamorphoses of the Virtual" ===
2013 had seen Myrvold's return to Venice for the exhibition "The Metamorphoses of the Virtual – 100 Years of Art and Freedom", as a parallel exhibition to the 55th Venice Biennale. Myrvold had a triple role this time, as an artist, a producer and a curator for this collective exhibition, also featuring such artists as ORLAN, Miguel Chevalier and Pixel Remote HackLab. The exhibition, celebrating 100 years of women's voting rights in Norway, focused on the concept of the virtual and its interaction with our everyday lives.

In the exhibition catalog, Officina delle Zattere's host curator Roberta Semeraro writes: 'Norwegian Pia Myrvold puts technological interfaces to the core of her artistic research and thus puts herself in the center of the platform where man and computer connect and exist in dialogue'.

"The Metamorphoses of the Virtual – 100 Years of Art and Freedom" was nominated for the best parallel exhibition at the Venice Biennale.

Following the Venice edition of "The Metamorphoses of the Virtual", Myrvold had been invited to present some of the featured art installations in an immersive space at the opening of the Lab at Google Cultural Institute in Paris on December 10, 2013, in the presence of French Minister of Culture Fleur Pellerin and one of the Internet's founding fathers and Google's Chief Internet Evangelist Vint Cerf.

=== "The Metamorphoses of the Virtual 5 + 5" ===
In 2014, Myrvold presented a second edition of "The Metamorphoses of the Virtual" exhibition as a group show "The Metamorphoses of the Virtual 5+5" at the K11 Art Foundation in Shanghai, China.

The exhibition featured 5 artists from France such as Myrvold herself, Miguel Chevalier, ORLAN, Maurice Benayoun and Pascal Haudressy; as well as 5 Chinese artists, Aaajiao, Feng Membo, Miao Xiaochun, Tsang Kin-Wah and Zheng Da.

A part of the official program of the 50th anniversary of Franco-Sino diplomatic relations, this multi-sensorial experience was specifically tailored for the K11 Art Foundation.

Adrian Cheng, Founder and Chairman of the K11 Art Foundation, commented: 'We are very pleased to present this exhibition which we believe will strike a chord with many of us. Although new technologies and internet have taken a central place in our daily life and society, digital art remains in a paradoxical way quite confidential. These creators all belong to the same group of pioneers and visionary artists who share the certitude that the digital world offers new ways of making and perceiving art; a philosophy which is in tune with KAF's vision of art'.

=== "We Love Video This Summer" ===
Also in 2014, Myrvold followed up her Shanghai exhibition by another group exhibition in the Pace Gallery in Beijing. Entitled "We Love Video This Summer", the exhibition featured some of Myrvold's videos and 3D animations.

=== "ART AVATAR" ===
In November 2014, Myrvold was invited to present an immersive installation "ART AVATAR" in the Centre Georges Pompidou in Paris. The installation consisted of a virtual reality space mirrored with exact detail in the real space in real time. This allowed the public to make their personal animated sculpture (avatar) visible in the virtual space. Myrvold used tracking devices and infrared motion sensors in order to change the public's role from a spectator to a visual co-contributor in the exhibition.

=== "WANDS" ===
In 2015, Myrvold launched the installation series "WANDS - a first generation smart sculptures". WANDS are smart mixed media sculptures with integrated sensors measuring proximity, density and touch. They each respond according to their own parameters, interacting with the public each in their own way.

The first edition of WANDS had been presented in MYworLD Studio in Paris, Atelier NORD in Oslo, Norway, as well as during the 2016 New York Times' "Art for Tomorrow" conference in Doha, Qatar.

=== Art for Tomorrow Conference ===
In 2016, Myrvold was invited to speak at The New York Times' "Art for Tomorrow" Conference in Doha, Qatar, as a part of a panel of world-renowned artists, such as Jeff Koons and Marina Abramović. In her speech, she talked about her career as a digital artist and presented a new project currently in development, "Syn-Energy", consisting of site-specific large-scale installations harnessing the energy of the elements in order to create an interactive environment.
