= Cui Jie (artist) =

Chinese artist

Cui Jie (Chinese: 崔洁; born 1983) is a Chinese artist who specializes in oil painting and 3-D printed sculpture. Cui's body of work is largely characterized by her play with space and dimensionality, which take shape in her geometric imaginings of Chinese cityscapes. The most common subjects of her works are models of Chinese cultural landmarks of the 1980s and 1990s, such as Shanghai Bank Tower, which are either already or soon-to-be demolished. These towering structures are often surrounded by organic, swirling shapes to place them in a constant state of motion and transition, yet a 'sinofuturistic' context which both revives and reinvents their initial purposes.

== Biography ==
Cui was born in Shanghai in 1983. In 2006, she graduated from China Academy of Art Oil Painting Department. She currently lives and works in Beijing, China. Cui is represented by LEO XU PROJECTS and Mother's Tankstation, Dublin. In 2012, she was described by The Wall Street Journal as one of the youngest "China's Rising Art Stars." She has been named one of Phaidon Press's leading painters in its publication, Vitamin P3, and she is profiled in the December/January 2015 issue of Surface Magazine.

Cui's early works questioned the truth in reality through the unconventional combination of images on canvas, a multi-perspective approach which she associates with Orson Welles. Later, in groups of new paintings, she shifted her style from the previous one to the study of forms and figure-ground relationship. In these paintings, she pays much attention to and magnifies the architectural details of structures, buildings and landscape, using the idea of fragments and layers to convey a sense of alienation. To reach their dream-like state, her scenes employ huoshaoyun (literally, 'fire clouds') and similar non-naturalistic environments, fusing both time and space.

Her classical training is reflected most apparently in her most recent exhibitions, which merge a variety of architectural styles to create fantastical, futuristic images of urban Chinese metropolises. Cui's blending of forms and emphasis on unity emerge from conceptions of the ideal in Chinese history. The theme of Chinese industry and the role of the worker, for instance, appears in her repeated subjects of government buildings, extending her works into the realm of political commentary on Mao era socialism, nationalism, and collectivist propaganda while also speaking to contemporary building practices of rapid urbanization: the razing of village and suburban communities to erect residential and commercial districts. As a result, many of her works obscure the delineation between utopian and dystopian landscapes, questioning upgraded culture and contemporary practices of cultural preservation.

Cui has stated that she views architecture as "experiencing history just as human beings;" interviews quote her artistic focus as an expansion on Wassily Kandinsky's synesthetic style of painting, visualizing sound itself and other sensuous experiences as part of the urban landscape. Cui Jie's work has been attributed to influences ranging from Bauhaus, Russian Constructivism, International, Surrealism, and Japanese Metabolism aesthetics. Her art directly recalls such perspectives in the 1959 Ten Great Buildings project in Beijing which followed the founding of the People's Republic of China in 1949, which were based in such architectural styles to reinvent China in the vision of Mao Zedong.

Her works have been exhibited worldwide, including at The 4th Prague Biennale (2009), “Poetic Realism: An Reinterpretation of Jiangnan—Contemporary Art from South China” (Madrid, 2008), Notes of Conception (Beijing, 2008).

== Exhibitions ==
Solo Exhibitions

- The Enormous Space, Cui Jie: Maison Fueter, OCAT, Shenzhen, China, 2018
- Latter, Former, Mother's Tankstation, Dublin, Ireland, 2016
- Cui Jie, Start Gallery, Jaffa, Israel, 2015
- The Proposals For Old and New Urbanism and Cui Jie, Leo Xu Projects, Shanghai, China, 2014
- CUI JIE, Leo Xu Projects, Shanghai, China, 2012

Group Exhibitions

- Front International: Cleveland Triennial for Contemporary Art, Richard D. Baron '64 Gallery, Oberlin, Ohio, 2019
- Past Skin, MoMA PS1, New York, USA, 2017
- The New Normal: Art and China in 2017, Ullens Center for Contemporary Art, Beijing, China, 2017
- Hack Space, curated by Hans Ulrich Obrist and Amira Gad, chi K11 art museum, Shanghai, China, 2016
- Hack Space, curated by Hans Ulrich Obrist and Amira Gad, K11 Art Foundation, Hong Kong, China, 2016
- A Beautiful Disorder, CASS Sculpture Foundation, Chichester, UK, 2016
- The World in 2015, UCCA, Beijing, China, 2015
- My Generation: Young Chinese Artists, Tampa Museum of Art, St. Petersburg, Florida; Oklahoma City Museum of Art, Oklahoma City, USA, 2014
- Greenbox: Remapping - The Space Of Medea Reality, Tianhong Mei Heyuan Arts Center, Hangzhou, China Studio, M50 Art Space, Shanghai, China, 2013
- The First “CAFAM·Future” Exhibition – Sub-Phenomena Report on the State of Chinese Young Art, CAFA Art Museum, Central Academy of Fine Arts, Beijing, China, 2012
- Face, Minsheng Art Museum, Shanghai, China, 2012
- CUI JIE, LI SHURUI, ZHANG JUNGANG & LI JIE, Leo Xu Projects, Shanghai, China, 2011
- Asian Landmark-Toyota Art Project, Iberia Center for Contemporary Art, Beijing, China, 2010
- 4th Prague Biennale, Prague, Czech Republic, 2009
- Self-Preservation Painting Exhibition, Magee Art Gallery, Beijing, China, 2009
- Poetic Realism: A Reinterpretation of Jiangnan-Contemporary Art from South China, Centro de Arte Tomás y Valiente, Madrid, Spain, 2008
- Notes of Conception, Iberia Center for Contemporary Art, Beijing, China, 2008
- Art Beijing 2008, Contemporary Art Fair, Beijing, China, 2008
- The Voyage beyond Time, China Cup Beach Art, Shenzhen, China, 2008
- Who are they? Where do they come from? Where do they go? 1918 ArtSpace, Shanghai, China, 2007
- China Academy of Art-Exhibition jointly held by Academies, West Five Art Center, Beijing, China, 2007
- Let's Play, Direction Gallery, Hangzhou, China, 2007
- Variety-Exhibition of Nominated Youth Painters, Hangzhou, China, 2006
- Shi san bu kao-Modern Art Exhibition, F2 Gallery, Beijing, China, 2006
- Zhejiang Province Oil Painting Exhibition won the Silver Prize, Ningbo, China, 2005
- Zhejiang Province Sports Art Exhibition, Zhejiang province, China, 2004
