= Michael Lin (artist) =

Taiwanese artist (born 1964)

- 林明弘
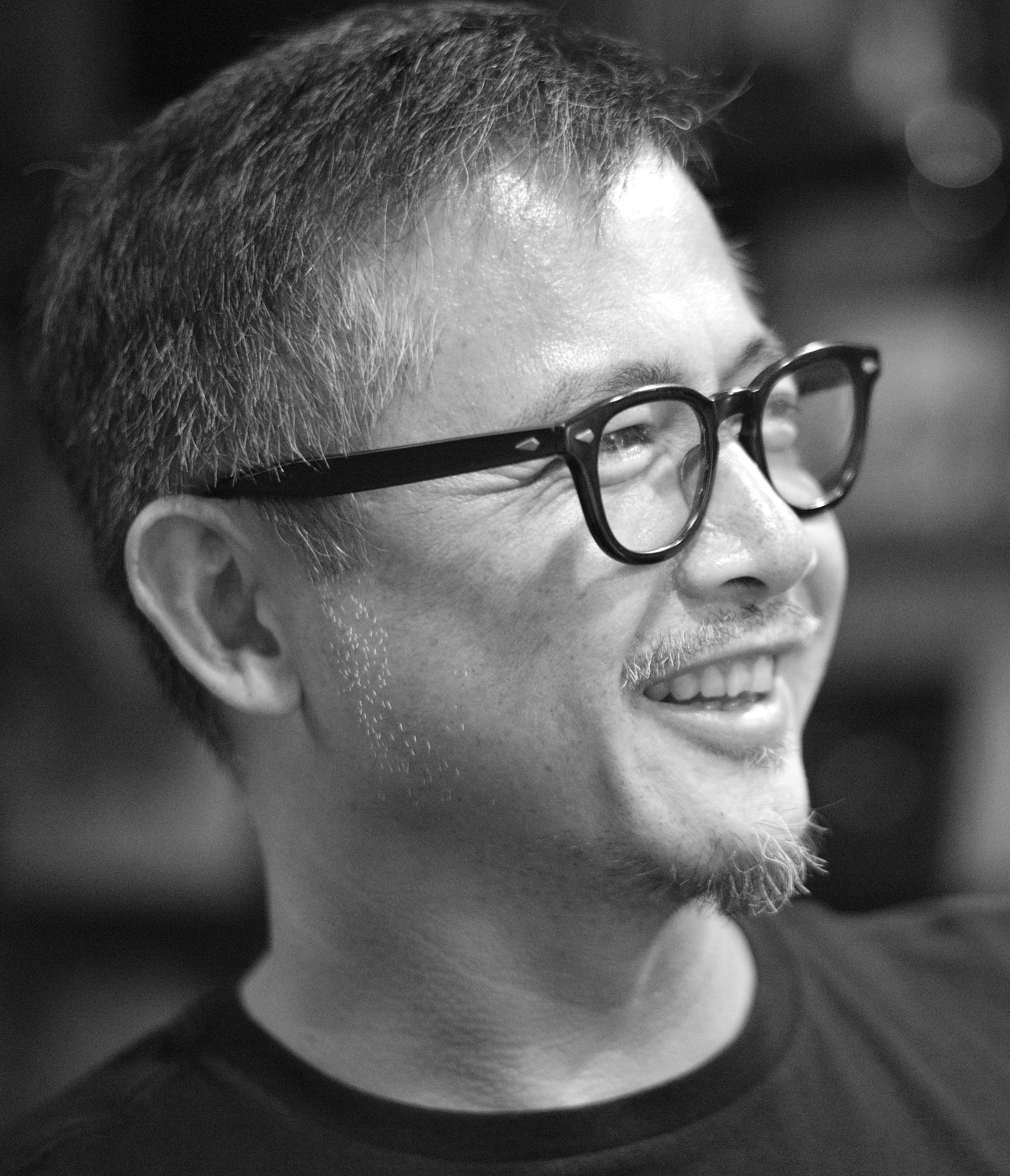
- Taipei, 2018
- Born: November 6, 1964 (age 61); Tokyo, Japan
- Website: www.ateliermichaellin.com

Michael Lin (Chinese: 林明弘; born 6 November 1964) is a Taiwanese artist who lives and works in Brussels, Belgium and Taipei, Taiwan. He was born in Tokyo, Japan, and grew up in Taiwan and the United States. Lin is considered a leading Taiwanese contemporary painter and conceptual artist.

== Biography ==
Lin was born in Tokyo in 1964 to a Taiwanese family, and raised in Taiwan. His family immigrated to Los Angeles in 1973, during a time of political uncertainty for Taiwan. Lin embraced the multiculturalism of Southern California, and took an interest in its art and skateboarding scenes.

Lin graduated from Otis Art Institute of Parsons School of Design, Los Angeles in 1990, and obtained an MFA from Art Center College of Design, Pasadena in 1993. He counted among his influences the artists Daniel Buren, Dan Graham, and Franz West, the essayist Elaine Scarry and her work on culture in the body, and Taiwanese New Wave Cinema directors such as Hou Hsiao-hsien, Tsai Ming-liang, and Edward Yang.

Lin has worked as an artist in Taipei, Paris, Brussels, and Shanghai. He currently lives and works in Brussels and Taipei.

== Career ==
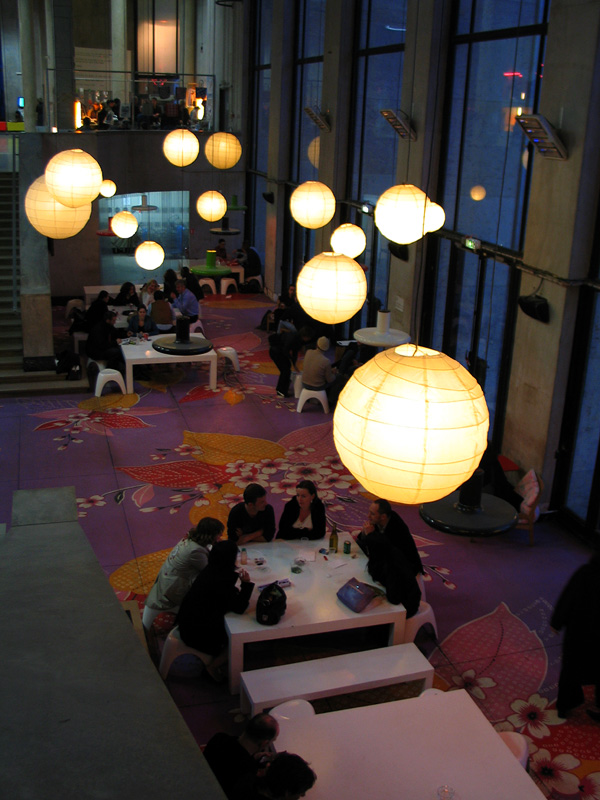
PALAIS DE TOKYO 22.01-22.8.2002, 2002 (Emulsion on wood). Palais de Tokyo, Paris, France.

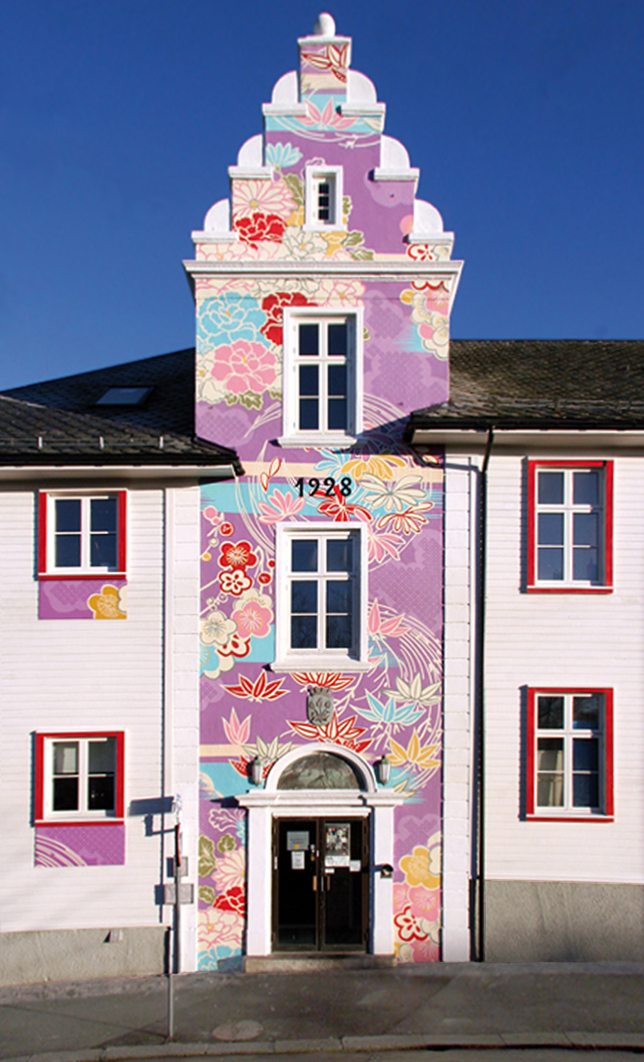
Permanent installation, 2007. Rogaland School of Art, Stavanger, Norway

=== 1993–2000 ===
Lin moved to Taipei from Los Angeles in 1993. The artist Richard Lin, a relative on his father's side, became an important early mentor. For two years Lin worked as a bartender at the independent artist-run IT Park Gallery (伊通公園), where he met a group of like-minded artists and launched his career.

Lin's first solo exhibition, Meander (IT Park, 1994), featured monochrome steel panels spray-painted at an auto body shop. Lin had been exposed to industrial and automotive design at art school, where he adopted the materials and techniques for painting with car lacquer and spray guns. However, he did not find the Taipei audience as receptive to his work's minimalist aesthetic rooted in Los Angeles car culture.

Lin responded to the challenge of audience communication with Interior (IT Park, 1996). He modeled a domestic setting in the gallery space by re-locating some of his home furnishings, including two carpets, a stereo, and his music collection, with a sign that read, "Please remove your shoes before stepping on to the carpet. Feel free to choose from the selection of music." Lin opened a dialog between the public space of the gallery and the private space of the home, to address the gap between his and his audience's conceptions of contemporary art. This initiated the role of the public in Lin's work, his concept of artist as host and audience as guest, and his approach of creating participatory artwork using everyday objects. Interior was Lin's first exhibition to feature paintings with flower motifs. He had chanced upon embroidered muslin pillowcases in his home, and recalled the traditional floral patterns from his youth in the countryside, where they would adorn the bedding given as part of a wedding dowry. He crafted frames the same size as the pillows, copied their patterns and projected them onto a canvas, and reproduced them as colorful paintings.

With House (Bamboo Curtain Studio, 1998), Lin began working on an architectural scale, filling an entire wall of the exhibition space with a 45 square meter floral patterned mural. Complementary (Dimension Endowment of Art, 1998) paired paintings of pillowcases with a raised tatami mat featuring real pillows. This public resting place created a kind of "social sculpture", and Lin removed a wall to let in natural light. Untitled–Cigarette Break (IT Park, 1999) featured flower print paintings and a pair of Le Corbusier LC-2 chairs partially upholstered with the same patterns, as a critique of the relationship between art, design, and architecture, and the opposition of ornamentation with modernism.

Lin continued to explore the role of the public and the environment in his work. For Imported (La Ferme du Buisson, 1998), he replicated a scenario from his hometown daily life by installing tables and stools and offering hundreds of cigarettes and bottles of Taiwan Beer to visitors, framed by billboards for the brands. Lin's contribution to the group show Tu parles/J'écoute (Taipei Fine Arts Museum, 1998) invited the other artists to document the lighting conditions for their artworks, and integrated their drawings and descriptions into a new multimedia work with sound samples of museum visitor announcements.

Lin was invited to participate in the 2000 Taipei Biennial, The Sky is the Limit, curated by Jérôme Sans and Manray Hsu. He created a "social space" in the entrance hall of the Taipei Fine Arts Museum, deploying a large-scale floor painting decorated with phoenix and peony motifs and furnished with cushions bearing the same pattern.

=== 2001–2005 ===
After 2000, Lin received numerous invitations to exhibit his work abroad. He represented Taiwan at the 2001 Venice Biennale, and participated in the 2001 Istanbul Biennial and the 2002 Gwangju Biennale. He continued to create installations for museums, such as such as Kiasma Day Bed (Kiasma, 2001), and for large public spaces, such as ATRIUM STADHUIS DEN HAAG, 12.07-08.09.2002 (The Hague City Hall, 2002).

Lin moved his studio to Paris in 2002. That year he was commissioned by Nicolas Bourriaud and Jérôme Sans to create a site-specific installation and floor painting for the café lounge at Palais de Tokyo. Bourriaud and Sans invited Lin to the 2005 Biennale de Lyon, where he covered La Sucrière in a 100 square meter mural of an enlarged wallpaper pattern. He followed this up with Notre Histoire (Palais de Tokyo, 2006), featuring a large mural painting from a cartoon image.

For Grind (MoMA PS1, 2004), Lin installed an indoors skateboard half-pipe decorated with a floral motif, and presented a similar work based on a traditional design from the Shanghai fabric market at the group show Odyssey (Shanghai Gallery of Art, 2004). At Kunsthalle Wien in 2005, Lin covered the windows with decorative patterns but left the gallery space empty, transforming the glass pavilion into an enormous oriental lamp.

=== 2006–2015 ===
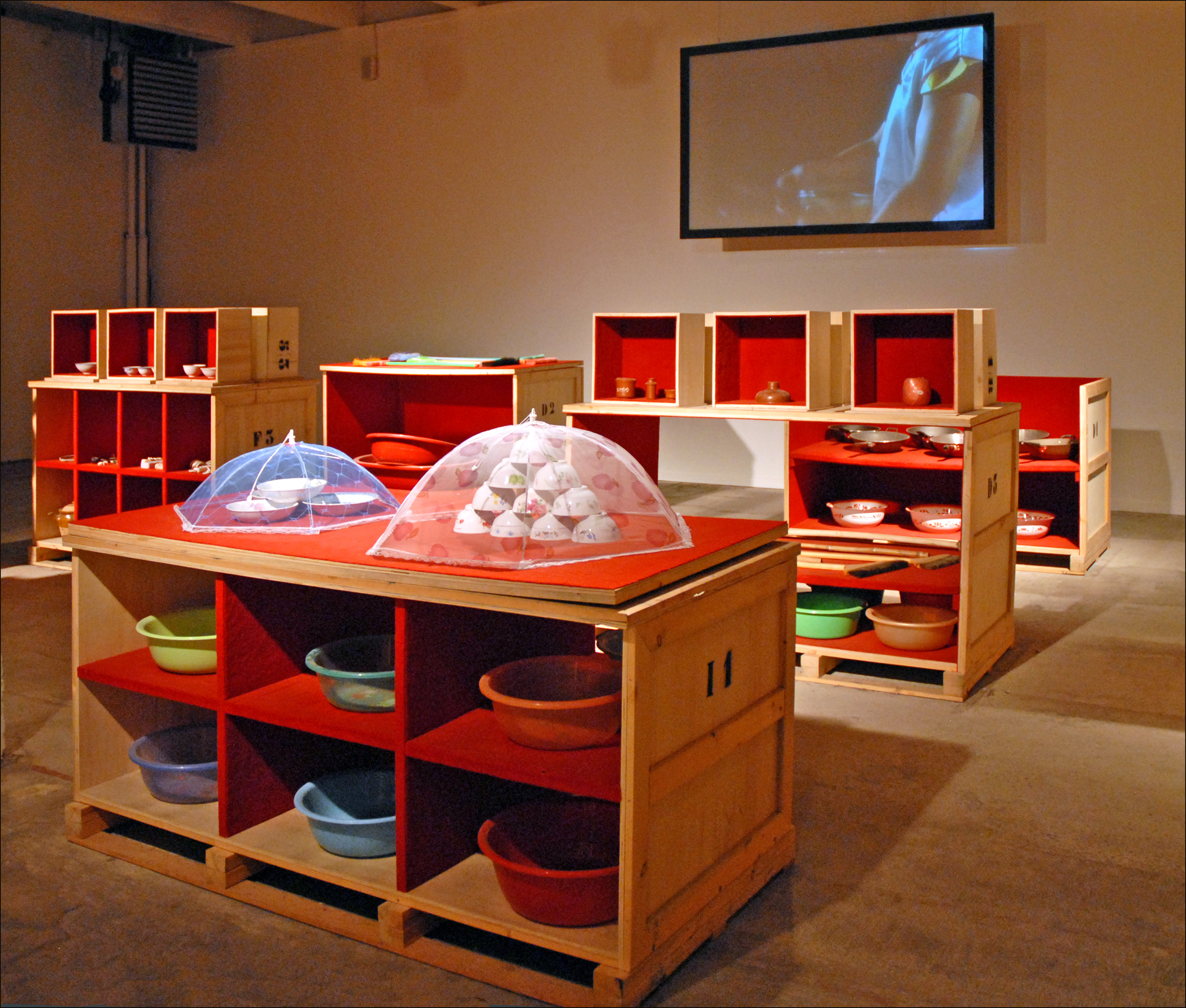
What a Difference a Day Made, 2008. 10th Biennale de Lyon.

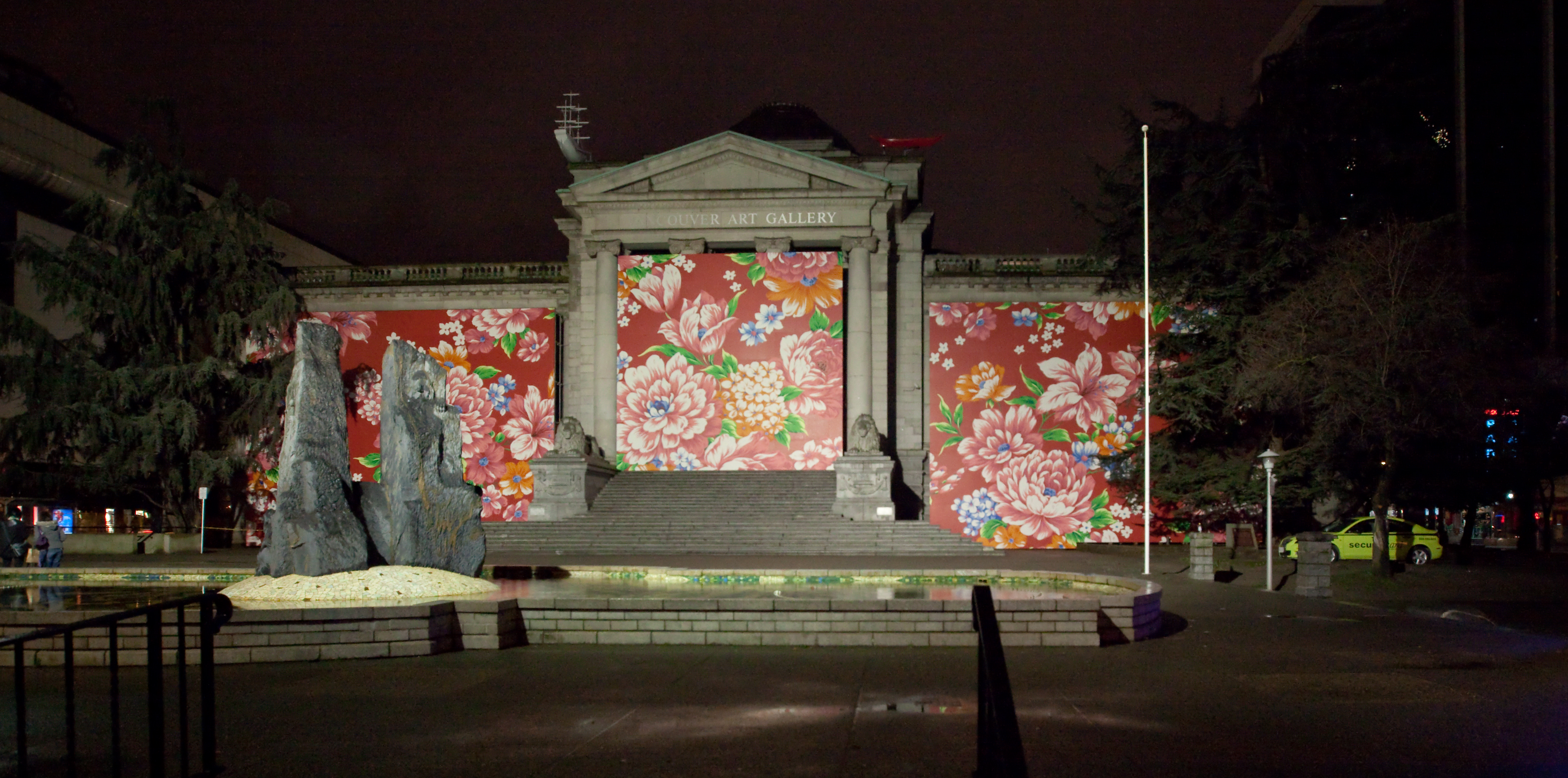
A Modest Veil, 2010. Vancouver Art Gallery, Vancouver, Canada.

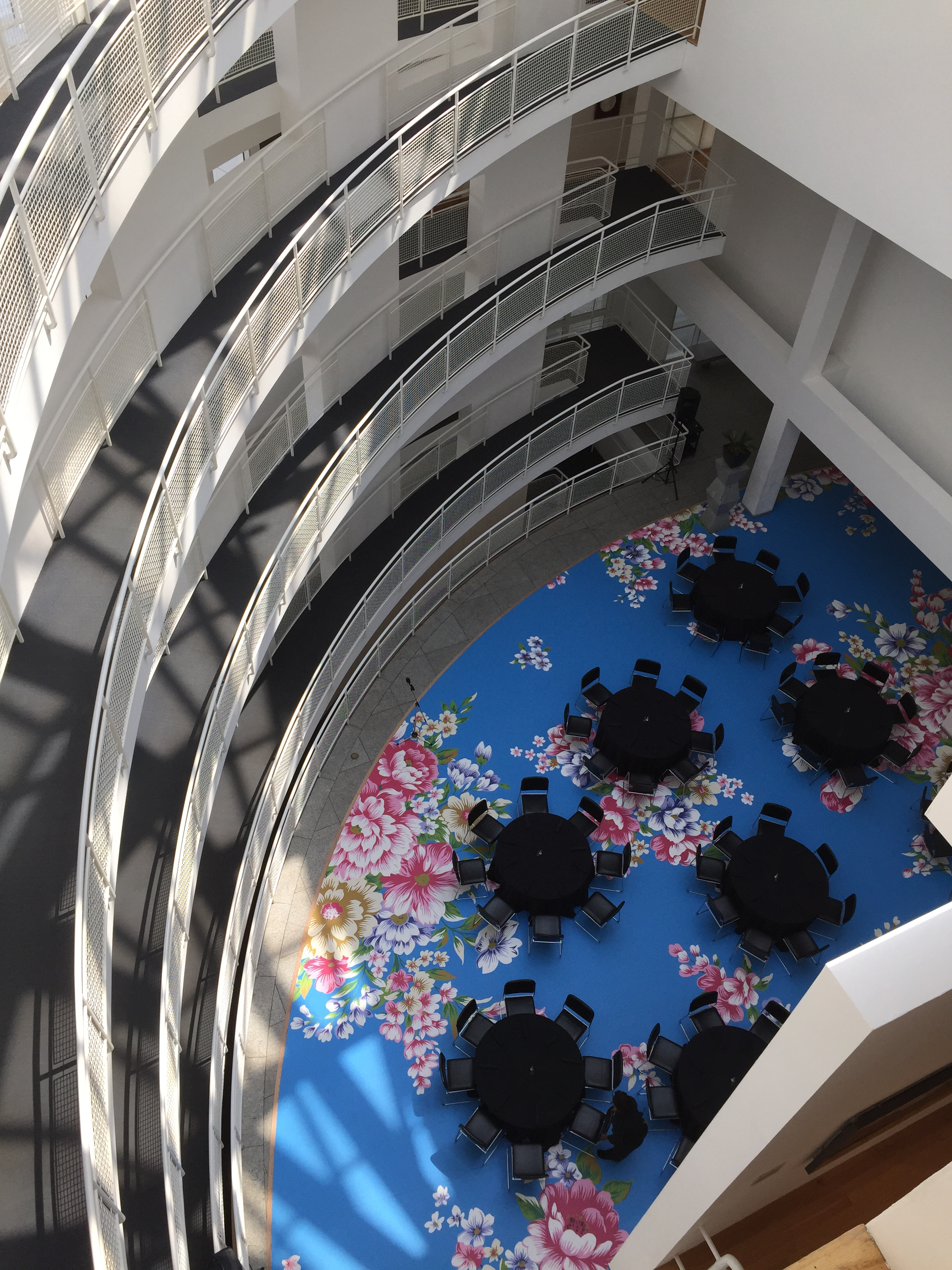
Utah Sky 2065-40 (blue curve), 2015. High Museum of Art, Atlanta, GA.

Lin moved to Shanghai in 2006, and continued to explore themes of personal, cultural, and political identity through his artwork. Island Life (2006, Eslite Gallery) presented paintings based on Uyghur and Tibetan carpets alongside a painting of a Tai Bao Zheng, a travel permit for Taiwanese to enter mainland China. I am the Sun (2009, Eslite Gallery) featured paintings based on suncake logos and elementary school workbooks, and large tangram-shaped paintings of Bambi. Concurrent to the exhibition, Lin wrapped thousands of books at the Eslite Bookstore in Taipei in pink paper bearing phoenix and peony motifs, in a work titled "21.2.1972" after Richard Nixon's 1972 visit to China.

Lin opened a number of exhibitions that did not feature his signature floral paintings. For What a Difference a Day Made (Shanghai Gallery of Art, 2008), Lin bought out an entire daily goods store, cataloguing and arranging its contents for viewing in the gallery. He later presented the work at the 2009 Biennale de Lyon and the 2011 Singapore Biennale. For Place Libre (Tang Contemporary, 2013), he used a minimal paint scheme to transform the gallery into a free parking lot.

Lin's exhibition A Modest Veil (Vancouver Art Gallery, 2010) installed large floral paintings on the façade of the museum. He collaborated with the architecture firm Atelier Bow-Wow and video artist Cheng Ran on Model Home: A Proposition by Michael Lin (Rockbund Art Museum, 2012). They created a temporary workers' dormitory, and painted the museum interior with a pattern borrowed from bedding used by laborers in Shanghai, while filming the whole process. They adapted the work for the 2013 Auckland Triennial, using a paper building technique in place of welded steel, and participated in Frieze London 2014.

For FreePort [No. 005]: Michael Lin (Peabody Essex Museum, 2012), Lin turned to patterns from coats of arms to decorate the museum floors and walls, and installed hundreds of mass-produced copies of an early Chinese porcelain depiction of a European. At the 2013 California-Pacific Triennial, Lin showed an acrylic mural titled "Sharawadgi", based on a Chinoiserie portrayal of Chinese garden features. In 2015, he re-staged his installation from Interior (1996) for the ASIA NOW Paris Asian Art Fair, created a site-specific work for the SCAD Museum of Art, and presented "Utah Sky 2065-40 (blue curve)" at the High Museum of Art.

=== 2016–present ===
Lin left Shanghai in 2016, splitting his time between Taipei and Brussels. His exhibition A Tale of Today (LEO XU Projects, 2016) featured a row of vintage Shanghai Forever bicycles, and walls painted with patterns and designs borrowed from the bicycle frames. New Paradise (Eslite Gallery, 2016) showed landscape paintings based on the packaging of daily foodstuffs.

Lin worked with local communities and art college students in Manila on his exhibition Locomotion (MCAD Manila, 2016). He exchanged tarps that adorn neighborhood pedicabs for ones of his own design. The used tarps, a local design tradition, were showcased in the exhibition, while the artist-designed ones were ridden around the city.

In 2017, the National Gallery of Victoria commissioned a floor painting, titled "Federation", which Lin painted in collaboration with local artists, and Chiostro del Bramante featured a floor painting for the group exhibition Enjoy. The following year, Lin collaborated with Swiss visual artist Beat Streuli on the architectural and curatorial project Opening (Taiwan Contemporary Culture Lab, 2018) and the exhibition One Plus One (Eslite Gallery, 2018).

During the 2019 Art Basel Hong Kong, BANK exhibited works by Michael Lin together with those of Richard Lin (who died in 2011). At the same time, the Centre for Heritage, Art and Textile (CHAT) in Hong Kong commissioned a site-specific work, a set of large curtains for their lounge. Back in Taipei, Lin created a public installation 24/7 (Taipei Fine Arts Museum, 2019) featuring raised tatami mats, walls and cushions colored after Taiwanese convenience stores, and paper lamps by Isamu Noguchi.

In 2020, Lin presented a digital artwork based on traditional Taiwanese window patterns, which was displayed on the side of the Taipei 101 skyscraper in conjunction with the second edition of Taipei Dangdai art fair. He also completed a 1300 square meter floor painting for the plaza and ground floor of Museo Jumex, derived from a popular Mexican tablecloth pattern. In 2022, Lin created the site-specific installation Pentachrome at the Metropolitan Museum of Art based on vases from the museum's Chinese ceramics collection.

=== Commercial work ===
Lin has undertaken a number of collaborations with luxury fashion, furniture, and tableware brands. He has worked with Italian furniture manufacturer Moroso and the fashion house Dolce and Gabbana, and created store interiors for Louis Vuitton. Lin has designed a series of cups for illy, and key cards for several Le Méridien hotels. Many of his exhibitions feature artist's multiples and design objects, which re-conceive the museum and gallery shops as an extension of his art practice.

In 2008, Lin contributed a floral mosaic flooring to the Chanel Mobile Art Pavilion, a portable exhibition hall designed by Zaha Hadid which was shown in Tokyo and New York.

== Critical reception ==
Lin is associated with the generation of artists who are invested in the philosophy of Relational Aesthetics, but he also concerns himself with the regional cultural topography and works in the local vernacular. He started developing a reputation in the late 1990s for his use of vast expanse of bold flowers, a visual motif that is characteristic of the endemic culture of Taiwan. His floral patterns, imitating embroideries that would typically adorn Taiwanese pillows, are inspired by the vicissitudes in the domestic and political climates of Taiwan felt by the artist when he returned to the region after many years abroad. His repetitive and ostensibly simple floralscapes, highly attuned to the Taiwanese visual vocabulary, have, however, proved to be the most politically and culturally resonant portion of his work.

Lin's work has associations with architecture, as he conceives of his art not merely as a piece of flat canvas, but as a space that the viewers can interact with and within. This idiosyncratic artistic understanding is shown by many of his large-scale installation works, including Model Home: A Proposition by Michael Lin at the Rockbund Art Museum in Shanghai, and Grind at MoMA PS1 in New York.

== Exhibition ==
=== Selected solo exhibitions ===
- 1994: Meander, IT Park Gallery, Taipei, Taiwan
- 1996: Interior, IT Park Gallery, Taipei, Taiwan
- 1998: House, Bamboo Curtain Studio, Taipei, Taiwan
- 1998: Imported, La Ferme du Buisson, Noisiel, France
- 1998: Complementary, Dimension Endowment of Art, Tapei, Taiwan
- 1999: Untitled–Cigarette Break, IT Park Gallery, Taipei, Taiwan
- 2002: Palais de Tokyo, Site de Creation Contemporaine, Paris, France
- 2003: Spring 2003, Palais de Tokyo, Site de Creation Contemporaine, Paris, France
- 2004: Grind, MoMA PS1, Long Island City, NY, USA
- 2004: In Sickness and in Health, Contemporary Art Museum St. Louis, St. Louis, MO, USA
- 2005: Kunsthalle Wien, Vienna, Austria
- 2006: Island Life, Eslite Gallery, Taipei, Taiwan
- 2008: What a Difference a Day Made, Shanghai Gallery of Art, Shanghai, China
- 2009: I am the Sun, Eslite Gallery, Taipei, Taiwan
- 2010: A Modest Veil, Vancouver Art Gallery, Vancouver, Canada
- 2012: FreePort [No. 005]: Michael Lin, Peabody Essex Museum, Salem, MA, USA
- 2012: Model Home: A Proposition by Michael Lin, Rockbund Art Museum, Shanghai, China
- 2013: Place Libre, Tang Contemporary, Beijing, China
- 2014: Frieze, London, England
- 2015: SCAD Museum of Art, Savannah, GA, USA
- 2015: High Museum of Art, Atlanta, GA, USA
- 2016: A Tale of Today, Leo Xu Projects, Shanghai, China
- 2016: New Paradise, Eslite Gallery, Taipei, Taiwan
- 2016: Locomotion, Museum of Contemporary Art and Design, Manila, Philippines
- 2017: The National Gallery of Victoria, Melbourne, Australia
- 2019: 24/7, Taipei Fine Arts Museum, Taipei, Taiwan
- 2020: Mariposa, B1-09, Museo Jumex, Mexico City, Mexico

=== Selected group exhibitions ===
- 1998: Tu parles/J'écoute, Taipei Fine Arts Museum, Taipei, Taiwan
- 2000: The Sky is the Limit, Taipei Biennial, Taipei Fine Arts Museum, Taipei, Taiwan
- 2001: 49th Biennial Of Venice, Taiwan Pavilion, Venice, Italy
- 2001: 7th Istanbul Biennial, Istanbul, Turkey
- 2001: Ars O1, Kiasma Museum, Helsinki, Finland
- 2002: International, Liverpool Biennial, Liverpool, England
- 2002: Gwangju Biennial, Gwangju, Korea
- 2003: Bibliotherapy, Kunstmuseum Luzern, Luzern, Switzerland
- 2004: Odyssey, Shanghai Gallery of Art, Shanghai, China
- 2005: Biennale de Lyon, Lyon, France
- 2006: Notre Histoire, Palais de Tokyo, Paris, France
- 2007: Moscow Biennial of Contemporary Art, Moscow, Russia
- 2009: The Spectacle of the Everyday, Biennale de Lyon, Lyon, France
- 2011: Singapore Biennale, Singapore
- 2013: 5th Auckland Triennial, Auckland, New Zealand
- 2013: California Pacific Triennial, Newport Beach, CA, USA
- 2015: ASIA NOW Paris Asian Art Fair, Paris, France
- 2017: Enjoy, Chiostro del Bramante, Rome, Italy
- 2018: Opening, Taiwan Contemporary Culture Lab, Taipei, Taiwan
- 2018: One Plus One, Eslite Gallery, Taipei, Taiwan
- 2019: Art Basel, Hong Kong
- 2019: Centre for Heritage Arts & Textile, Hong Kong

Lin is represented in Taiwan by Eslite Gallery.

== See also ==
- Taiwanese art
