= Chen Wei (artist) =

Chinese artist

Chen Wei (Chinese: 陈维) is a Chinese artist famous for his photography work.

== Biography ==
Chen Wei was born in 1980, in Zhejiang Province, China. Currently he lives and works in Beijing, China.

In his early career, he used to deal with experimental music and later turned to photography. Chen Wei's photographs are believed to express his inner thoughts and emotions. Most of his works are finished in his studio.

Chen has exhibited around the world, including Seoul Museum of Art, Museum of Art, Museum of Contemporary Art Shanghai, Pingyao International Photography Festival, Poznan Biennale and Fotografiska Shanghai. Commissioned by fashion and art magazines such as FHM and LEAP, Chen has produces a few projects that bring together conceptual photography and fashion design, featuring products by Bottega Veneta, LV, and Prada, among others.

He was one of the artists involved in the exhibition called "A Plus" held by Lane Crawford and Modern Weekly, which aimed to gather together the top fashion designers and artists in China.

Chen Wei won the "Best Photography Artist" in Dead Rabbit Awards (2011) held by art magazine randian 燃点.

== Selected exhibitions ==
=== Solo exhibition ===
2011

Tight Rope, Yokohama CreativeCity Center, Yokohama, Japan

=== Group exhibitions ===
==== 2016 ====
Chinese Whispers, Zentrum Paul Klee, Bern, Switzerland

==== 2014 ====
"Control", Yang Xinguang and Chen Wei Group Show, Feizi Gallery, Brussels, Belgium

==== 2011 ====
Sweet Dreams (Are Made of This), Leo Xu Projects, Shanghai, China

==== 2024 ====
Sweet Dreams, Fotografiska Shanghai, China
