= Cheng Ran (artist) =

Chinese contemporary artist

Cheng Ran (Chinese language: 程然) is a Chinese contemporary artist known for his film and video works.

== Biography ==
Cheng Ran was born in 1981 in Inner Mongolia, China. In 2004, he graduated from China Academy of Art. Currently he lives and works in Hangzhou, China.

== Work ==
Cheng mainly focuses on new media and his artworks are mostly videos and films. Cheng's works are created by applying basic cinematic techniques like simple cutting, rearranging, montage, full length shot and so on. Usually, his videos do not have complete and coherent storylines, and sentiment is the main part to show.

In 2012, Cheng Ran participated in artist Michael Lin's exhibition "Model Home" at Rockbund Art Museum in Shanghai. Working with Lin, Cheng recorded the whole process of the preparation and the construction work of the exhibition and then presented the videos in the final show.

Cheng Ran is represented by LEO XU Projects.

== Awards ==
In 2011 he won the "Best Video Artist" in Dead Rabbit Awards held by online art magazine Randian. The winning piece "Chewing Gum Papers” is a simultaneously hypnotic and sinister combined with Martin Luther King’s “I have a dream” speech as the background sound; and it is also a piece of commissioned work for LEO XU PROJECTS's inaugural show "Sweet Dreams (Are Made of This)". In 2019 Cheng won the Nomura Emerging Artist Award, valued at 100,000 USD.

== Solo exhibitions ==
2016

- The New Museum, New York.

2011

- "Hot Blood, Warm Blood, Cold Blood", Galerie Urs Meile, Beijing-Lucerne, Beijing
- "Circadian Rhythm", Qingying Gallery, Hangzhou

2009

- "Immersion and Distance", Ullens Center for Contemporary Art, Beijing
