= Gabriel Lester =

Dutch inventor, visual artist and film director

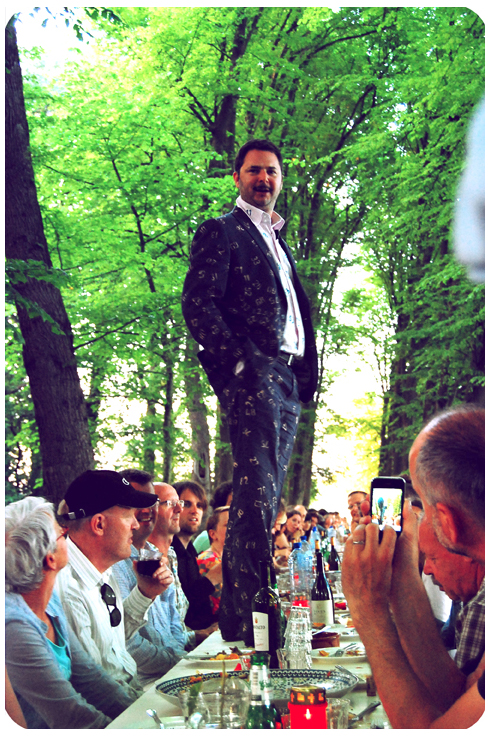
Lester at The Night at van Duivenvoorde by Rosa Maria Koolhoven, 2010.

Gabriel Lester (Amsterdam 1972) is a visual artist and film director living and working in Amsterdam.

== Family ==
Born in Amsterdam to a New York–born father and a Brussels–born mother. He grew up in a commune in Pieterburen, Groningen.

== Music ==
In the 1980s Lester was active in early street and hip-hop culture. He wrote graffiti under the name Catch and produced rap and electronic music as Utile Connection and Definitely Def, first with tape loops, cassette decks and turntables, later with samplers and sequencers.

== Education and Residencies (selection) ==
1994 Sint Joost School of Art and Design, audiovisual arts Sint Joost art academy

1995 Sint-Lukas Hogeschool, Brussels, experimental cinema

1999–2001 Rijksakademie, Amsterdam

Residencies include IASPIS (Stockholm), ISCP (New York), Capacete (Brazil and Peru), TWS Tokyo Wonder Site (Tokyo) and Elam School of Art (Auckland).

== Artistic practice ==
Lester’s work includes spatial and video installations, sculptures, performances and short films, as well as public art, small-scale architecture, mentoring and teaching. His international practice spans residencies, exhibitions and gallery representation in Europe, North America and Asia. He has participated in leading exhibitions such as Documenta (Kassel) and the biennials of Venice, São Paulo, Istanbul and Sydney. Rooted in storytelling, his work creates contexts that support or reinterpret narratives. While his visual language is cinematic, it extends across media. With an emphasis on human experience, his projects invite reflection on perception, representation and our relationship to the world.

Lester currently resides in Amsterdam and is represented by the Vanguard gallery in Shanghai and Ryan Lee gallery in New York.

Lester’s work is part of several public and private collections, including the Stedelijk Museum, Amsterdam, 798 Art Zone Beijing, 21 Museum Nashville, Mudam Luxembourg, CitizenM, and Museum Boijmans Van Beuningen, Rotterdam.

Publications on the work of Gabriel Lester include: How to Act (monograph, Veenman publishers 2006), ‘Gabriel Lester’s Elevating the Witte de With’ (Paperkunsthalle 2007), ‘62 Gasoline Stations’ (artist book self-published 2007), Forced Perspectives (monograph, Sternberg Press 2015), Cinema Without Camera (2019)

== PolyLester ==
Founded in 2013 by Gabriel Lester and Martine Vledder, PolyLester is a multidisciplinary studio for artworks, public sculptures, architectural interventions, landscapes and interior design.

== Curriculum ==
Selected solo exhibitions

- 2027 – Kröller-Müller Museum, Otterlo (NL)
- 2026 – PolyLester, Arcam, Amsterdam (NL)
- 2024 – Dig It, RyanLee Gallery, New York (US)
- 2024 – Odeon, Blaffer Museum, Houston (US)
- 2024 – Majestic, Vanguard Gallery, Shanghai (CN)
- 2023 – Dig It, Galerie Fons Welters, Amsterdam (NL)
- 2021 – Ohm, Elektriciteitsfabriek, Den Haag (NL)
- 2020 Holes in the Sky - Machinery of Me, Arnhem Netherlands
- 2017 Aeon and Lester’s Loops Groninger museum, Groningen (NL)
- 2017 If you happen to be Ryan Lee gallery, New York (USA)
- 2016 Apple Z De Appel Art center, Amsterdam (NL)
- 2016 The 9 Day Week CAC museum, Vilnius (LT)
- 2014 The Ears Have Walls Leo Xu Projects, Shanghai (CH)
- 2014 Follies Bonner Kunstverein, Bonn (D)
- 2013 Blank Stare Gus Fisher Gallery, Auckland (NZ)
- 2012 Roxy Minsheng Museum, Shanghai (CH)
- 2012 The Future that Was NASA/Smart, Amsterdam (NL)
- 2011 Suspension of Disbelief Museum Boijmans Van Beuningen, Rotterdam (NL)
- 2009 ProMotion Z33, Hasselt (B)

Selected group exhibitions and Biennales

- 2024-2025 - Chroniques, Biennale des Imaginaires Numériques, Marseille/Aix-en-Provence (France)
- 2022 - Manif d’art 10, Québec City Biennial (Canada)
- 2021 - 2022 Chengdu Biennale: Super Fusion, Chengdu Art Museum (China)
- 2019 - Ural Industrial Biennial of Contemporary Art, Yekaterinburg (Russia)
- 2019 MOMENTUM10, Nordic Biennial of Contemporary Art, Moss (Norway)
- 2018 - Busan Biennale, Busan (South Korea) (9th edition)
- 2016 - 2017 -Kochi-Muziris Biennale, India — 2016–2017
- 2015 - Istanbul Biennial, Istanbul (Turkey) — 2015 (14th edition)
- 2015 - Moscow Biennale, Moscow (Russia)(6th edition)
- 2014 - CAFA Art Museum, Beijing (China)(2nd CAFAM Biennale: The Invisible Hand)
- 2014 - Marrakech Biennale, Marrakech (Morocco)(5th edition)
- 2014 - Biennale of Sydney, Sydney (Australia)(19th edition)
- 2013-2014 - Garden of Diversion, Sifang Art Museum, Nanjing (China)(opened Nov 2, 2013)
- 2013 - Performa 13, New York (USA)
- 2013 - Sharjah Biennial, Sharjah (UAE)
- 2012 - dOCUMENTA (13), Kassel (Germany)
- 2010 - São Paulo Biennial, São Paulo (Brazil)(29th edition)
- 2009 - The Secret of the Ninth Planet, CCA Graduate Program in Curatorial Practice, San Francisco (USA)
- 2009 - Slow Movement or: Half and Whole, Kunsthalle Bern (Switzerland)
- 2013 ; 2007 - Venice Biennale, Venice (Italy)
- 2006 - Busan Biennale, Busan (South Korea)(3rd edition)

== Boards / Positions ==
- 2026–2025 Lecturer, Berlin University of the Arts (UdK), Berlin
- present–2014 Chair, The One Minutes Foundation, Amsterdam
- 2023–2016 Board member, Kunstinstituut Melly, Rotterdam
- 2020–2013 Lecturer, Audio-Visual Department, Gerrit Rietveld Academie, Amsterdam
- 2019–2016 Main tutor, Fine Arts, Sandberg Institute / Gerrit Rietveld Academie, Amsterdam

== Gallery ==
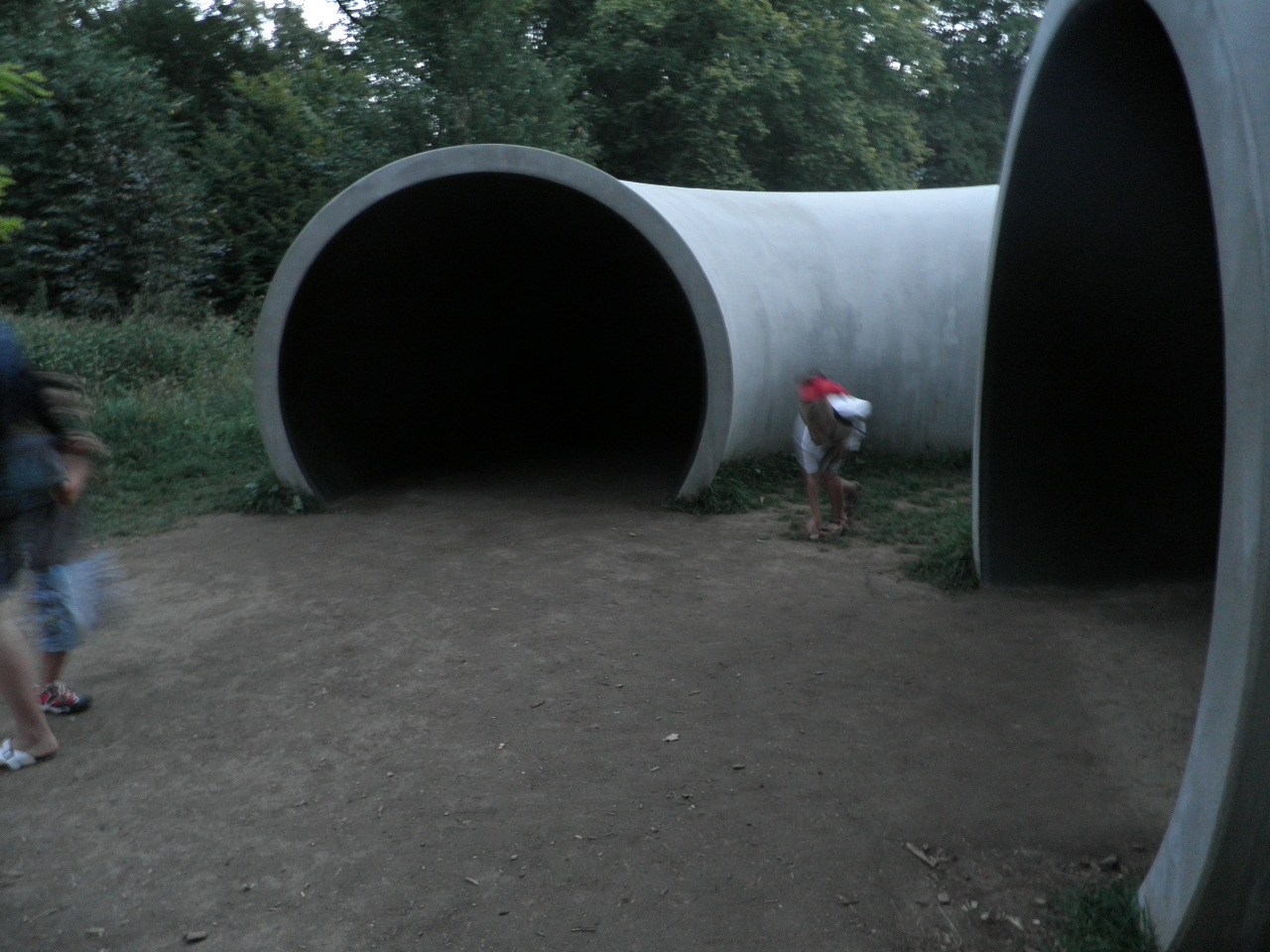
Gabriel Lester, Transition, DOCUMENTA (13), 2012.
