= Aaajiao =

Chinese artist

aaajiao (Xu Wenkai)
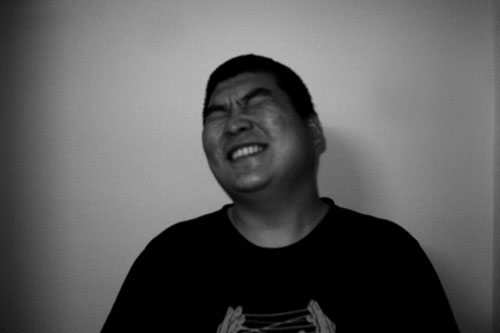
- Born: November 30, 1984 (age 41); China
- Known for: Media art, conceptual art, software art, networked art
- Website: eventstructure.com

aaajiao, is the online handle of Xu Wenkai (Chinese: 徐文恺), a Shanghai- and Berlin-based artist, avid blogger and free thinker.

Born in 1984, aaajiao grew up in Xi'an. Being one of the most frequently exhibited Chinese new media artists, aaajiao has been featured in both international and domestic scenes. Highlights include: “Global Control And Censorship - ZKM | Zentrum für Kunst und Medientechnologie Karlsruhe, Karlsruhe (2015)”, The 2nd “CAFAM Future” Exhibition: Observer-Creator · The Reality Representation of Chinese Young Art Beijing, CAFA Art Museum (2015); Cosmos - Limited and Limitless, Existence and Co-existence Shanghai, 21st Century Minsheng Art Museum (2014), Thingworld - International Triennial of New Media Art Beijing, The National Art Museum of China (2014), The West Bund Architecture and Contemporary Art Biennale, Shanghai (2013); “One World” Exposition – Chinese Art in the Age of the New Media, Videotage, TransLife: Media Art China 2011 - International Triennial of New Media Art Beijing, The National Art Museum of China (2011), Hong Kong (2011); Transmediale, Berlin (2010), etc. aaajiao is a winner of the Jury Prize from Art Sanya Awards 2014, a nominee of OCAT – Pierre Huber Art Prize, and most recently, a nominee of the “Young Artist of the Year” of 9th “Award of Art China”.

== Selected solo exhibitions ==
- 2020 Deep Simulator, Turin Castello di Rivoli
- 2020 URL is LOVE – A Digital Retrospective, Cyberspace, Tabula Rasa Gallery
- 2020 Cave Simulator, May 2020, Shanghai, Aike
- 2019 a‘a’a‘jiao: an ID, Shanghai, HOW Art Museum
- 2018 bot, 8 Berlin, House of Egorn
- 2017 User, Love, High-frequency Trading, Shanghai, Leo Xu Projects
- 2016 Remnants of an Electronic Past, Centre for Chinese Contemporary Art, Manchester
- 2016 Remnants of an Electronic Past, OCAT Xi'an
- 2015 aaajiao – Untitled, Beijing, Gallery Yang
- 2015 Alias: aaajiao, Shanghai, Leo Xu Projects
- 2014 The Screen Generation @ 9m² -Museum, Shanghai, 9m² Museum ( Goethe Open Space)
- 2013 The Screen Generation, Shanghai, chi K11 art space
- 2013 The Screen Generation – Prequel Nov 2013 Beijing, C-Space
- 2011 Placebo, Shanghai, OtherGallery
- 2010 Cybernetics, Shanghai, V Arts Centre

== Selected group exhibitions ==
- 2020 PLAYER OF BEINGS, Ming Contemporary Art Museum, Shanghai
- 2020 Immaterial/Re-material: A Brief History of Computing Art UCCA Center for Contemporary Art Beijing
- 2020 Ars Electronica In Kepler's Gardens -A global journey mapping the ‘new’ world, Linz
- 2020 Facing the Collector. The Sigg Collection of Contemporary Art from China Castello di Rivoli Museum of Contemporary Art, Turin
- 2019 The Return of Guests – Selections from the PSA Collection Shanghai Contemporary Art Museum, Power Station of art, Shanghai
- 2019 A.I. Goooooooooogle infiltration Efremidis gallery, Berlin
- 2019 I Sing the Body Electric David Zwirner Gallery, HongKong
- 2019 Afterimage: Dangdai Yishu Lisson Gallery, London
- 2019 13th Cairo Biennale, Egypt
- 2019 Artificial Intelligence and Intercultural Dialogue, The State Hermitage Museum, Saint Petersburg
- 2019 Chinese Whispers – Neue Kunst aus der Sigg Collection, Museum für Angewandte Kunst (MAK), Vienna
- 2018 Art in the Age of the Internet, 1989 to Today, University of Michigan Museum of Art, Michigan
- 2019 Bad Code, Power Station of art, Shanghai
- 2018 GLOBAL CONTROL AND CENSORSHIP, MODEM, Debrecen
- 2018 GLOBAL CONTROL AND CENSORSHIP, The National Library of Latvia, Latvia
- 2018 Brilliant City (Reprise), David Zwirner Gallery, HongKong
- 2018 GLOBAL CONTROL AND CENSORSHIP, The National Library of Technology, Prag
- 2018 Take Me (I'm yours) Villa Medici, Rome
- 2018 Chinese Medicine in America: Converging Ideas, People, and Practices, New York, The Museum of Chinese in America
- 2018 Art in the Age of the Internet, 1989 to Today, Institute of Contemporary Art Boston, Boston
- 2017 GLOBAL CONTROL AND CENSORSHIP, Estonia, Tallinna Kunstihoone
- 2017 Body Media II, Shanghai, Power Station of Art
- 2017 Shanghai Project Chapter 2 Exhibition: Seeds of Time, Shanghai, Himalayas Museum
- 2017 All Happens after Sunset..., Shanghai, MoCA Pavilion
- 2017 Create Spaces, Chengdu, Luxelakes·A4 Art Museum
- 2017 Moments and More: Documents of Culture Pavilion [wén huà guǎn] Online Art Project, Shanghai, OCAT
- 2017 Nominations, Three Rooms – International Touring Exhibition of Young Media Artists, Shanghai, Chronus Art Center
- 2016 A Strong Gale in the Dark Forest, Caochangdi, Chuangxinyi Internet Bar, Three Supermarkets, Beijing
- 2016 The 3rd Shenzhen Independent Animation Biennale, Shenzhen
- 2016 Temporal Turn: Art and Speculation in Contemporary Asia, Spencer Museum of Art, Kansas, USA
- 2016 "Ethics of Technology" Beijing Media Art Biennale, Beijing
- 2016 OVERPOP, Shanghai, Yuz Museum
- 2016 Take Me (I'm Yours) New York, Jewish Museum
- 2016 The Exhibition of Annual of Contemporary Art of China, Beijing, Minsheng Art Museum
- 2016 The Mud of Compound Experience, G/F, No. 98 Apliu Street, Kowloon, Hong Kong
- 2016 HACK SPACE, Hong Kong, K11 Art Foundation Pop-up Space
- 2016 Heavy Artillery, Australia, Rabbit Gallery
- 2015 Globale: Global Control And Censorship – ZKM | Zentrum für Kunst und Medientechnologie Karlsruhe, Karlsruhe
- 2015 Fusion: Chinese Modern And Contemporary Art Since 1930s Wuhan, Wanlin Art Museum of Wuhan University
- 2015 Frieze New York Frame, New York
- 2015 The 2nd “CAFAM Future” Exhibition: Observer-Creator · The Reality Representation of Chinese Young Art, HongKong, K11
- 2015 The Tell-Tale Heart, Chi Art Space, Hong Kong
- 2015 The 2nd “CAFAM Future” Exhibition: Observer-Creator · The Reality Representation of Chinese Young Art, Beijing, CAFA Art Museum
- 2014 2014 OCAT – Pierre Huber Art Prize Shortlist Exhibition The Truth About Entropy Shanghai, OCAT Contemporary Art Terminal, Shanghai
- 2014 Cosmos – Limited and Limitless, Existence and Co-existence Shanghai, 21st Century Minsheng Art Museum
- 2014 The 12th National Art Exhibition – Experimental Art, Beijing, Today Art Museum
- 2014 Metamorphosis of the Virtual 5+5, Shanghai, chi K11 art museum
- 2014 Silence – the 1990s, Paris, Balice Hertling
- 2014 Thingworld – International Triennial of New Media Art, Beijing, The National Art Museum of China
- 2014 PANDAMONIUM – Media Art From, Shanghai Berlin, Momentum
- 2014 Transience – Intractable Objects, Beijing, Taikang Space
- 2013 The West Bank Architecture and Contemporary Art Biennale, Shanghai
- 2013 Reading Shanghai, Leo Xu Projects
- 2013 Lost In The Labyrinth, New York, Harvestworks
- 2013 Truth, Beauty, Freedom and Money – Art After Social Media Era, Shanghai, chi K11 art space
- 2013 SHANGHAI SURPRISE – A GROUP SHOW ON CONTEMPORARY ART IN SHANGHAI, Shanghai, chi K11 art space
