= Guo Hongwei =

== About ==
Guo Hongwei (born 1982) is a Contemporary artist based in Beijing. Guo graduated from the Oil painting Department of Sichuan Fine Arts Institute in 2004. After graduation, he created a style of painting based on old photographs of the artist himself and his family. To create blurry reproductions of the original images, Guo Hongwei would dilute oil paint with turpentine. These works were later exhibited together at Dissolving Memories, his first solo exhibition at Connoisseur Art Gallery, Hong Kong, in 2007.

Guo Hongwei is known for his similarly unique application of watercolour: in ‘Chiaroscuro’ series (2009), which is also based on old photographs, the artist painted with watercolour on wet paper to create hazy and ambiguous forms.

In 2009, Guo Hongwei began to use varnish instead of turpentine to thin oil paint. Resulting paintings show that the paint has dried with crystallised edges. His subject matter also started to expand, moving away from old photographs to include natural specimens—botanical, animal, mineral—precisely replicated in watercolour.

In recent works, Guo has ventured into collage and started to experiment with new dimensions in visual art within a given flat surface. "From the physical perspective, Guo's practice neither bolsters nor weakens the informational capacity of the 2D print medium— he simply records it."

== Exhibitions ==
Guo has exhibited at a number of venues. In 2013, he appeared at UCCA in the group exhibition ON | OFF: China's Young Artists in Concept and Practice. His works were also shown at Shanghai Zendai, MoMA (2007 and 2006), Today ArtMuseum (2007), and Shanghai Biennale (2012).

=== Selected solo exhibitions ===
● Pareidolia, Chambers Fine Art, New York (2020)

● Lustrous and Dazzling, Gallery 100, Taipei (2015)

● Miss Oyu, Frieze New York (2014)

=== Selected group exhibitions ===
● Between Past and Futures: SGA Collection Exhibition, Shanghai Gallery of Art (2018)

● Yebisu International Festival for Arts & Alternative Visions, Tokyo (2016)

● My Generation: Young Chinese Artist, Orange County Museum of Art, Newport Beach (2015)
