= Lu Yang (artist) =

Chinese new media artist

- Born: 1984 (age 40–41); Beijing, China
- Education: China Academy of Art, Hangzhou
- Movement: Contemporary art
- Awards: Deutsche Bank International Prize (2022)
- Website: https://luyang.asia/

Lu Yang (Chinese: 陆扬; born 1984) is a Chinese artist.

== Biography ==
Lu Yang was born in 1984 in Shanghai, China. Her parents worked for a medical company, and he spent significant parts of her childhood being treated for asthma and other conditions.

Originally admitted to the programme for painting, Yang received a Master of Arts in New Media from the China Academy of Art in Hangzhou, where she studied under Zhang Peili.

Raised by a Buddhist family, Yang cites an early interest in religion and belief systems, which later led to biology, neuroscience and religion being central to her artistic oeuvre. Yang's upbringing was also heavily influenced by foreign pop music and anime, which led her to later identify with Japanese otaku and online subcultures.

Assigned female at birth, Yang is gender-neutral and uses she/her pronouns. While critics often focus on biographical details, the artist has stated that "By living on the Internet, you can abandon your identity, nationality, gender, even your existence as a human being. I rather like this feeling."

== Artwork ==
Yang's practice is grounded in a variety of symbols, identities and narratives. These include Buddhist theology, Chinese cosmology, biology, anime, robotics and gender theory. Much of her work centres around her non-binary digital avatar, named DOKU.

The most renowned of Yang's artworks are narrative-based video art pieces, but she has also worked in longer format video, game design and sculpture.

Yang's work has been the subject of solo shows in Europe, the USA, China, Australia and Japan. In 2015, Yang represented China at the 56th Venice Biennale.
