= LAS Art Foundation =

Coordinates: 52.5257°N 13.4097°E

LAS Art Foundation is a non-profit arts organisation in Berlin, Germany. It was launched in 2019 by Jan Fischer and Bettina Kames, focussing on exploring the intersection of art, science and technology.

The foundation's primary objective is to develop groundbreaking projects and experiences that envision the future and investigate topics ranging from artificial intelligence and quantum computing to ecology and biotechnology.

LAS Art Foundation collaborates with visionary artists, thinkers and institutions to develop innovative projects and experiences. Through its diverse programme, which includes newly commissioned and existing exhibitions and performances, educational programming, publications, and research projects, the foundation seeks to illuminate the connections between art, science and technology.

== History ==
LAS was established as a platform for exhibitions exploring the intersections between science, technology and art. The foundation was co-founded by transport entrepreneur Jan Fischer and the art historian Bettina Kames, who both wanted to bring these themes to non-specialist audiences. Currently, the foundation has various locations, and the exhibitions occur across different sites in Berlin, including Berlin|Kraftwerk Berlin and Halle am Berghain. The current Head of Programme is Carly Whitefield.

In April 2023, Light Art Space changed its name to LAS Art Foundation, which resulted in an extensive rebranding and a new website. The organisation has produced exhibitions, events and educational programming exploring the intersections of art, science and technology since 2019. The rebranding reflects the organisation's evolution and commitment to making art accessible to everyone. The new website provides an interactive platform for audiences to explore the organisation's past, present and future programming.

== Programming ==
Together with collaborators, LAS commissions exhibitions, performances and experimental formats, which bring new perspectives to the critical subjects of our times, from artificial intelligence, gaming and quantum computing to ecology and biotechnology.

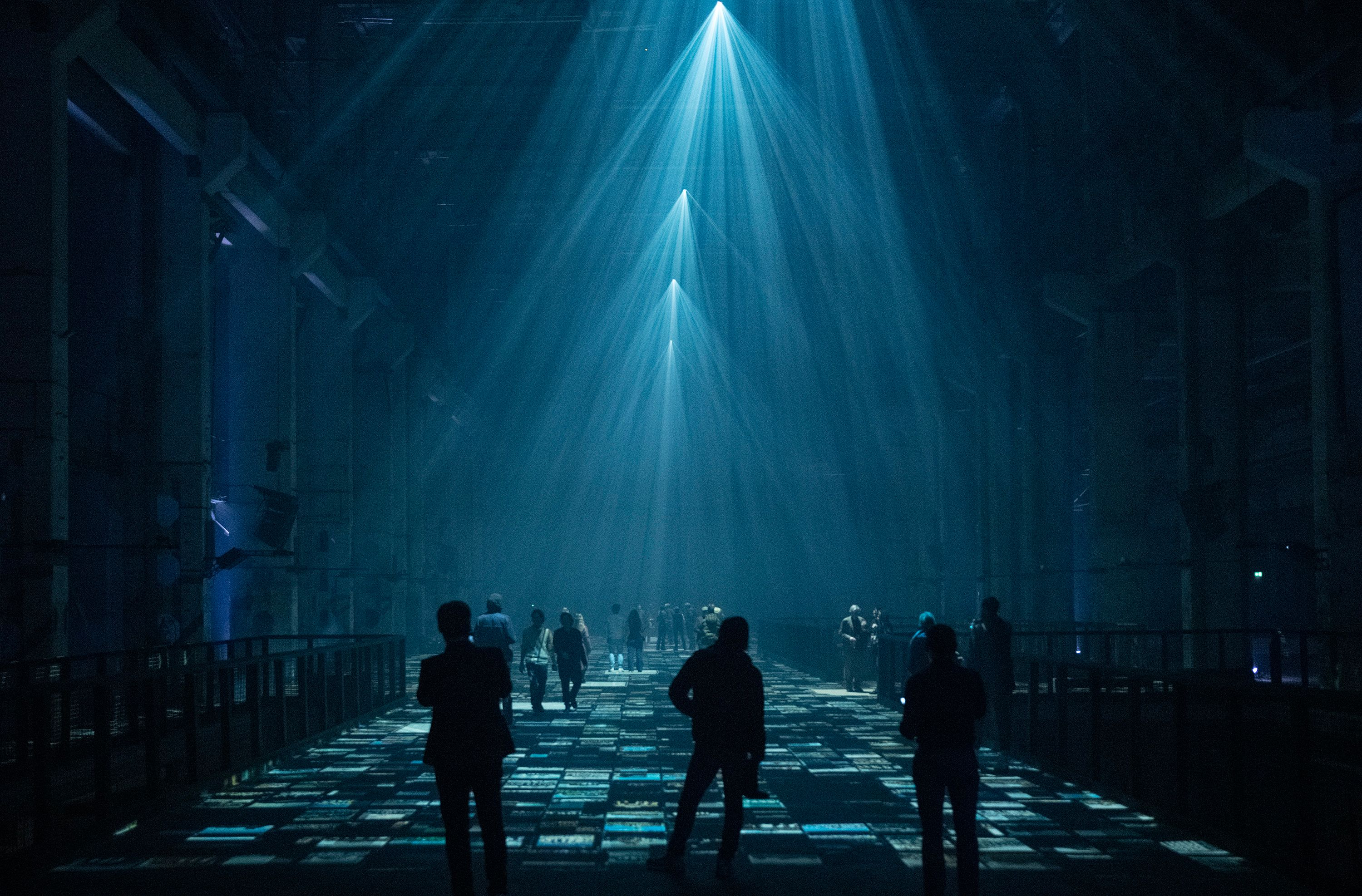
Refik Anadol, Latent Being, 2019, Kraftwerk Berlin

The first exhibition from LAS included the artist Refik Anadol, who presented a site-specific installation called ‘Latent Being’ at Kraftwerk Berlin from 23 November 2019 to 5 January 2020. The large-scale installation featured AI data paintings that responded to the vastness of the former East Berlin power plant. The immersive and interactive environment transformed data about the city, architecture, and visitors into hallucinogenic AI data paintings on LED walls. Anadol's work challenged visitors’ perception of space and their relationship with AI entities, expanding the possibilities of architecture, narrative and the body in motion.

From 10 July 2021 until 26 September 2021, LAS presented artist Jakob Kudsk Steensen's immersive installation, ‘Berl-Berl’, at Halle am Berghain, which explores the ecology and mythology of Berlin's origins as a wetland formed over 10,000 years ago. Using a method of macro photogrammetry, the artist created a 3D rendering of the remaining wetlands of Berlin-Brandenburg, weaving in local specimens from the Museum für Naturkunde Berlin to create an immersive, absolute landscape. Kudsk Steensen collaborated with sound artist Matt McCorkle and singer Arca to create a soundscape that blends environmental sounds and ancient wetland culture songs. The exhibition pays tribute to the city's history and mythology and aims to spark a newfound appreciation for the swamp and our role within this ecosystem that sustains us.

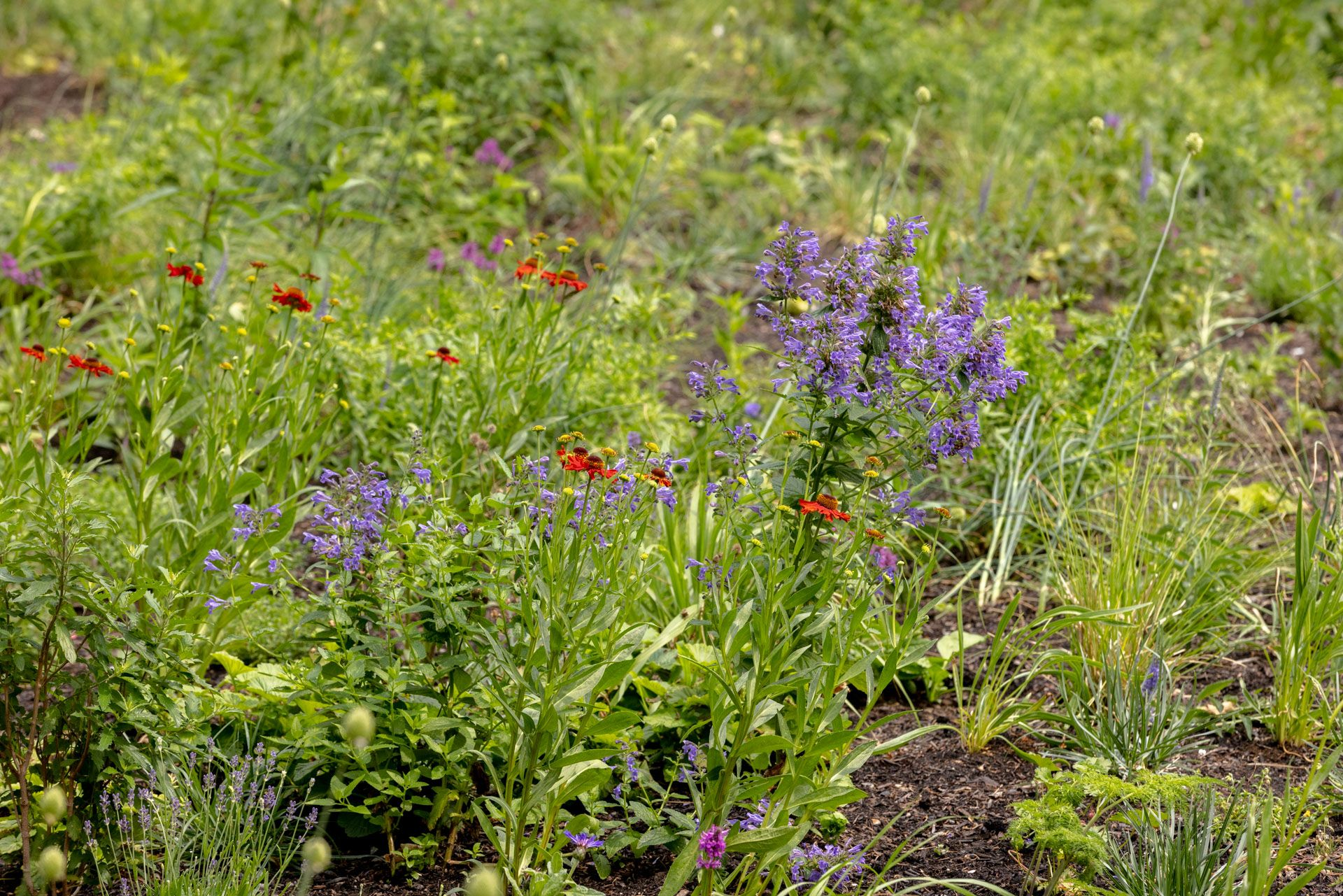
Pollinator Pathmaker LAS Edition Museum für Naturkunde Berlin 2023

LAS's latest project, ‘Pollinator Pathmaker’ is a living artwork project designed by Alexandra Daisy Ginsberg to address the decline of pollinating insects due to habitat loss, pesticides, invasive species and climate change. The project creates ‘Edition Gardens’ based on planting schemes developed by an algorithmic tool that chooses locally appropriate plants to benefit pollinators. The LAS Edition, the first one outside of the UK, was installed in Berlin in the summer of 2023, and the public can access it as a public installation. The ‘Pollinator Pathmaker’ website offers a free tool for anyone to create pollinator-friendly artwork for community spaces, schools and home use. The project aims to be the world's largest climate-positive artwork, inviting institutions to join the campaign to create regional Plant Palettes.

LAS's programme deepens its look at some of the topics that will come to define our lives in the years to come: AI, interspecies relationships, web3, gaming and quantum computing. The programme asks, “Whose visions are paving the way to the future?” Emerging and established artists centre a range of approaches and perspectives on what's at stake in our collective futures.
