= Tomás Saraceno =

Argentinian artist

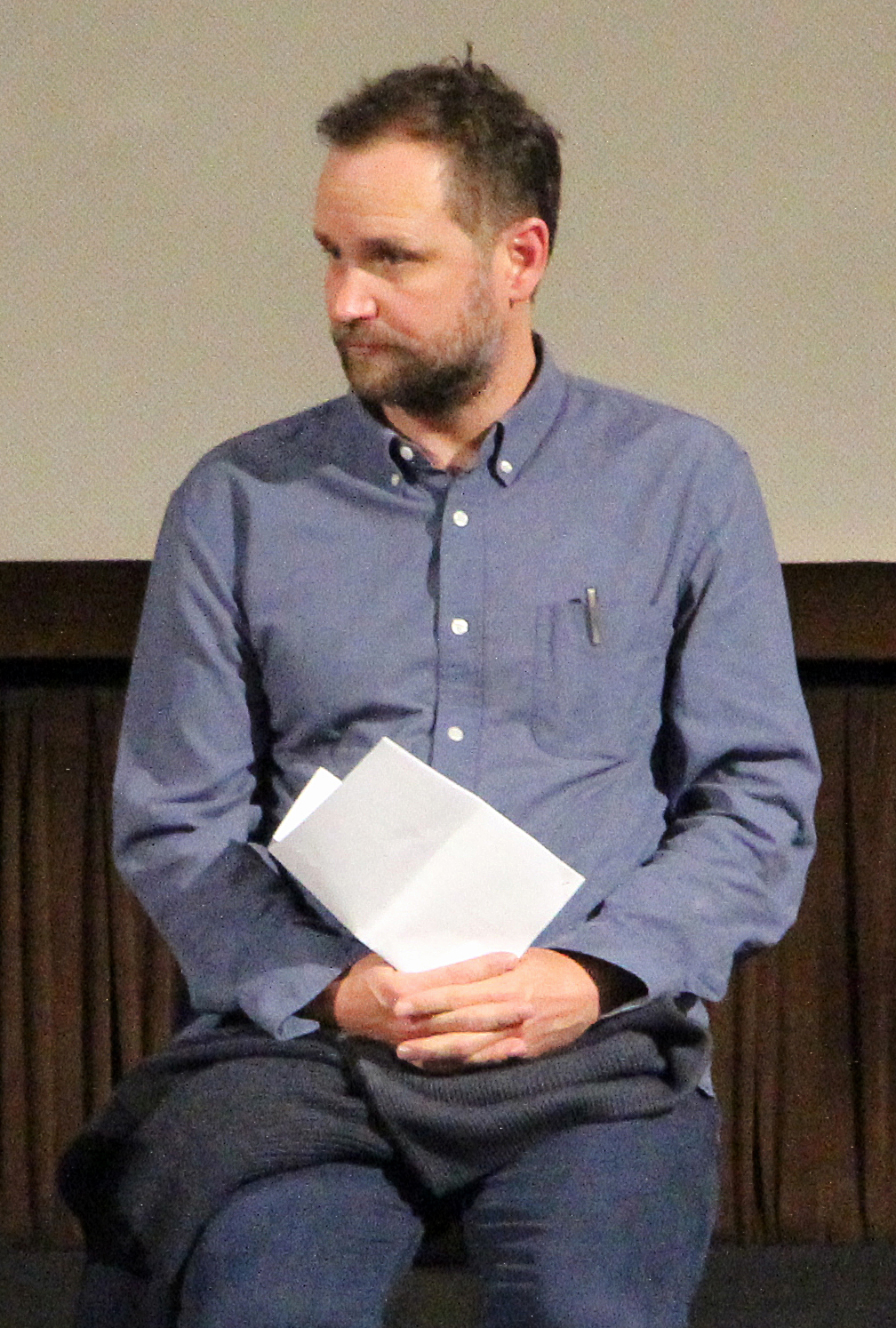
- Born: 1973 (age 52–53); San Miguel de Tucumán, Argentina
- Known for: Installation Art, Sculpture
- Website: studiotomassaraceno.org

Tomás Saraceno (born 1973) is an Argentine contemporary artist whose projects consist of floating sculptures, international collaborations, and interactive installations.

For more than two decades, Saraceno has activated projects aimed towards an ethical collaboration with the atmosphere, including the sculpture series Cloud Cities (2002–) and Museo Aero Solar (2007–), a community-organised initiative that transforms waste plastic bags into flying, aerosolar sculptures. These projects later grew into the Aerocene Foundation, a non-profit organization devoted to community building, scientific research and artistic experiences. Together with Saraceno in 2020, Aerocene launched the certified, untethered flight Fly with Aerocene Pacha, achieving thirty-two world records across Female and General categories for the flight's distance, duration and altitude—lifted using only the heat of the sun and the air.

Saraceno is also known for his interest in spiders and their webs, which led to the formation of the interdisciplinary community Arachnophilia, a research-driven initiative that refines concepts and ideas related to spider/webs across different forms of knowledge and multiple artistic, scientific and theoretical disciplines. Notably, Saraceno collaborated with researchers at the Photogrammetric Institute of TU Darmstadt to develop the Spider/Web Scan, a novel, tomographic technique that allowed, for the first time ever, precise 3D models to be made of complex spider webs. Through Arachnophilia, Saraceno engages international audiences to develop more profound understandings of the role spiders play within our cosmic web of life, through initiatives such as Mapping Against Extinction as presented in the project's Arachnomancy App.

== Education and artistic career ==
Tomás Saraceno studied architecture at Universidad Nacional de Buenos Aires between 1992 and 1999, after which he studied art and architecture in a postgraduate program at Escuela Superior de Bellas Artes de la Nación Ernesto de la Cárcova – both courses were taken in Buenos Aires. Saraceno then moved to Europe to complete his postgraduate studies at Germany's Städelschule. There, he was directed by Daniel Birnbaum (curator of the 53rd Venice Biennale) and studied under professors Thomas Bayrle and Ben van Berkel.

Saraceno's first installations were exhibited at the Venice Biennale of Architecture in 2002 and again at the Venice Arte Biennale in 2003, as well as at the São Paulo Biennale of 2006. In 2003–2004 Saraceno participated in the course "Progettazione e Produzione delle Arti Visive" (Design and Production of Visual Arts), held by Hans Ulrich Obrist and Olafur Eliasson at Instituto Universitario di Architettura di Venezia (IUAV).

The artist established his studio in Frankfurt am Main in 2005 and later relocated to Berlin in 2012, where he moved into the former administrative building of Actien-Gesellschaft für Anilin-Fabrication (AGFA) in Berlin-Rummelsburg. A team of studio members from multidisciplinary backgrounds, including designers, architects, anthropologists, biologists, engineers, art historians, writers, and musicians, work directly with Saraceno in the studio's hybrid environment.

In 2009, he attended the International Space Studies Program at NASA Center Ames (Silicon Valley, California). That same year, Saraceno exhibited in the 53rd Arte Venice Biennale "Fare Mondi/Making Worlds", curated by Daniel Birnbaum, and won the Calder Prize.

In the past two decades Saraceno has collaborated with the Massachusetts Institute of Technology, Max Planck Institute, Nanyang Technological University, Imperial College London and the Natural History Museum London.

He has lectured in institutions worldwide, and directed the Institute of Architecture‐related Art (IAK) at Braunschweig University of Technology, Germany (2014–2016)

He has held residencies at Centre National d'Études Spatiales (CNES) (2014–2015), MIT Center for Art, Science & Technology (2012–ongoing) and Atelier Calder (2010).

== Aerocene ==
The Aerocene Foundation is a non-profit initiative initiated by Tomás Saraceno in 2015, that aims to explore environmental issues scientifically and artistically through a diverse international community of artists, architects, geographers, philosophers, thinkers, speculative scientists, explorers, balloonists and technologists. The project's activities include the testing and circulation of aerosolar sculptures that are lifted into the by the heat of the Sun and infrared radiation from the Earth's surface.

Aerosolar sculptures were officially presented during the United Nations Climate Change Conference COP21, at Grand Palais, Paris, 2015, after that a similar prototype has been tested in November at the White Sands Dunes of New Mexico. On November 8, 2015, it broke world records by achieving the longest and most sustainable certified flight (without fossil-fuel, solar panel, helium or batteries) ever registered: During approximately 2 hours and 15 minutes, seven people were lifted up in White Sands' desert landscape. With a net lift of more than 250 kg, the payload of the "D-O AEC Aerocene" solar sculpture has no precedent in the long history of manned solar balloon flight attempts.

The project has evolved from Tomás Saraceno's residency at L'Observatoire de l'Espace, CNES. Led by Saraceno, the project's team is composed of leading scientists and engineers, including collaboration with Massachusetts Institute of Technology - Department of Earth, Atmospheric and Planetary Sciences (EAPS), Braunschweig University of Technology - Institute of Architecture-related Art (IAK), TBA21 Academy, Red Cross Red Crescent, and numerous universities, research centers, cultural and art institutions, and museums around the world.

=== Fly with Aerocene Pacha ===
On January 28, 2020, from Salar de Uyuni in Salinas Grandes of Jujuy, Argentina, Saraceno led the world's first manned solar-powered free flight during Fly with Aerocene Pacha.

Using only solar energy and air, pilot Leticia Marques lifted from the ground with Saraceno's aerosolar sculpture titled Aerocene Pacha. Aerosolar balloon technology, free of any dependency on carbon fossil fuel derivatives, utilised the heat of the sun's rays to warm the air inside the balloon, further amplified by the salt lake's reflective white surface. The flight set thirty-two world records within sixteen minutes, certified by The Fédération Aéronautique Internationale (FAI) in Class A (Free balloons) across Female and General categories for the flight's distance, duration and altitude.

The artwork was named Aerocene Pacha, after Saraceno's Aerocene Foundation and the Andean concept of the cosmos, Pacha. Saraceno worked together with local representatives of 33 indigenous communities of the Salinas Grandes for the project, including Tres Pozos, Inti Killa de Tres Morros (El Moreno), Pozo Colorado and San Miguel del Colorado. Members of these communities opened the flight launch event with ritual ceremonies to bless Pachamama – mother earth. They also spoke out to protest the exploitation of their traditional lands and rights by extractive industries. Aerocene Pacha flew bearing their slogan 'Water and life are worth more than lithium.'

Lali Chalabe, a legal representative of the indigenous communities of Salinas Grandes spoke at the event, in addition to Professor Maristella Svampa, an Argentinian writer and theorist specialized in extractivism and indigenous rights.

The experiment was commissioned by the K-Pop superstars BTS, through the global public art project, called CONNECT BTS, which supported art projects in five cities around the world.

=== Museo Aero Solar ===
The "Museo Aero Solar" group is an open-source international community, initiated in 2008 by Tomás Saraceno in conversation with Alberto Pesavento. The community organizes events around the world to turn plastic bags into lighter-than-air sculptures, creating airborne flying museums. Sending a message for sustainability, Museo Aero Solar retakes and transforms a pollutant. The resulting collection includes more than 20,000 plastic bags culled from countries including Colombia, Cuba, France, Germany, Italy, Austria, Palestine, Switzerland, the United Arab Emirates and the United States, amongst others.

=== Aerosolar sculptures ===
Aerosolar sculptures were officially presented during the United Nations Climate Change Conference COP21, at Grand Palais, Paris, 2015, shortly after the world first prototype (the D-0 AEC) test in the White Sands Dunes of New Mexico. On November 8, 2015, the D-0 AEC made its maiden voyage as the most sustainable flight, without fossil-fuel, solar panel, helium or batteries: During approximately 2 hours and 15 minutes, seven people were lifted up in White Sands' desert landscape only through the heat of the sun. With a net lift of more than 250 kg, the payload of the D-0 AEC aerosolar sculpture has no precedent in the long history of manned solar balloon flight attempts.

=== Aerocene Backpack ===
The Aerocene Backpack is a flight kit. Participants can hack the devices pack, create their own lightweight sensors, and lift them up. Data collected with the Aerocene Backpack can be uploaded and shared with Aerocene's open-source online community, via an interactive website that encourages participants all over the world to share their experiments, photos and videos, comments, and innovations.

=== Aerocene App ===
Beginning in 2012 and based on a concept and long-term research by artist Tomás Saraceno, the Aerocene App is based on the Float Predictor, an online digital tool developed by the Aerocene Foundation and Studio Tomás Saraceno in collaboration with Lodovica Illari, Glenn Flierl, and Bill McKenna from the Department of Earth, Atmospheric and Planetary Sciences (EAPS) at the Massachusetts Institute of Technology (MIT), together with Center for Art, Science & Technology (CAST) with further support from Imperial College London, Radioamateur, and the UK High Altitude Society.

The Aerocene App developed by Tomas Saraceno consists of a global forecasting system using open meteorological data to predict flight paths of aerosolar sculptures circling around the globe without CO_{2} emissions. The app incorporates real-time information from 16-day forecasts of wind speeds at different altitudes.

== Arachnophilia ==
Arachnophilia is a not-for-profit, interdisciplinary spider/web research community. Building on the innovations arising from Saraceno's collaborative research into spider/web architectures, materials, modes of vibrational signaling and behaviour, the broad aim of Arachnophilia is to increase visibility and change people's perceptions of spiders and webs within the context of the current ecological crisis.

=== Hybrid Webs ===
The secondary output of the research conducted in the Arachnid Research Lab are the Hybrid Webs - the collective term for a series of sculptures devised by Saraceno. Each sculpture, made entirely of spider silk is designed to appear as a unique, geometric galaxy floating in infinite space. Creating the sculptures means incorporating webs woven by spiders who are social, asocial or between the two. During the building period, the sculptures are turned onto each side, allowing gravity to aid the interweaving of silk from different sorts of spider. The works' titles reveal the technical specifications of each sculptural element; the genus and species of spiders employed and the time taken by each spider to complete its web. The final sculpture is thereby an emblem of an encounter which might not otherwise have succeeded, and so prompts a reflection on human coexistence with ourselves and the natural world.

Hybrid Webs have been exhibited worldwide:

- "May you live in interesting times", Venice Biennale, curated by Ralph Rugoff (2019).
- "ON AIR", Carte blanche to Tomás Saraceno at Palais de Tokyo, curated by Rebecca Lamarche-Vadel (2018-2019).
- Tanya Bonakdar Gallery, New York and at Palais de Tokyo, Paris (2018).
- Pinksummer Contemporary Art, Rome (2016).
- Istanbul Design Biennial, Istanbul (2016).
- 11th Shanghai Biennial, Shanghai (2016).
- Senckenberg Museum, Frankfurt (2016).
- UC Berkeley Art Museum and Pacific Film Archive, Berkeley, USA (2016).
- MARCO, Museum for Contemporary Art, Monterrey, Mexico (2016).
- Cultural Center; Espace Muraille, Geneva (2015).
- Chicago Architectural Biennial, Chicago (2015).
- Louvre Museum, Paris (2015).
- Georg-Kolbe-Museum, Berlin (2014).
- Museo di Villa Croce, Genoa, Italy (2014).
- Esther Schipper, Berlin (2012).

=== Arachnomancy App ===
On the occasion of the 2019 Venice Biennale, Tomás Saraceno launched the Arachnomancy App. Through this app, users are encouraged to notice, document and map spider webs they encounter in both wild and urban spaces. This app also uses the Arachnophilia biotremology archives to realise vibratory modes of interspecies communication that mobile devices make possible.

As users upload images, the Arachnophilia team attempts to add species or web-typographic information and geographical context, where possible. These photos and data populate a dynamic, global map. In turn, this map and the data it collects has the potential to generate an important resource and tool for researchers tracking species diversity - a dynamic archive of spider web biodiversity.

=== Arachnid Orchestra Jam Session ===
Saraceno has also developed a line of inquiry into the sound properties of spider webs. In collaboration with arachnologists, musicians and sound engineers based in Singapore and elsewhere, Saraceno has harnessed the structural properties of spider silk, transforming the web into a musical instrument. Since spiders do not possess an auditory system, they perceive the world around them with pressure and vibrations that come from their own movement, for example web-plucking. A cobweb is therefore a sensory object, an extension of a spider's body and the vibrations communicated via this practice are used for attraction, hunting and other social interactions. Saraceno has succeeded in amplifying these inaudible vibrations and web-pluckings into acoustic rhythms. This was presented by Saraceno at the 'Arachnid Orchestra Jam Session', curated by Ute Meta Bauer at the NTU Centre for Contemporary Art Singapore (2015). The focus of this exhibition, which included a run of live performances, was to push the boundaries of interspecies communication. This insight into non-human modes of communication helped formulate a more complex understanding of interspecies cohabitation – an idea at the fore of Saraceno's vision.

This research has also been presented in the major solo exhibition 'Cosmic Jive' at Villa Croce Museum of Contemporary Art (2014) and Saraceno's first solo exhibition in his native Argentina titled 'How to Entangle the Universe in a Spider Web' at the Museo de Arte Moderno, Buenos Aires (2017).

== Selected works, projects and exhibitions ==
=== The Sanctuary of Water, Salinas Grandes, Salta, Argentina ===
El Santuario del Agua (The Sanctuary of Water) is a permanent land art installation in the Salinas Grandes salt flats of northern Argentina, conceived by Saraceno following a request from the region's Indigenous communities for a sculpture that could support community-based tourism. It has been developed with the eleven Indigenous communities of the Red Atacama network, together with the Aerocene Foundation and Haus der Kunst in Munich, and is scheduled to open in late March 2027.

The work consists of five semicircular volumes built principally of salt, ranging from about two to thirty metres in diameter and up to fifteen metres high, arranged around a shallow reflecting pool so that each form is completed by its reflection. Stairs cut into the back of the structures lead to elevated viewing platforms, and orbital walkways circle the pool. The forms draw on the apacheta, the stone cairns left as offerings to Pachamama along Andean mountain paths, and are named according to Andean cosmology.

The project grew out of the collaboration that produced Fly with Aerocene Pacha in 2020 and is presented as a response to lithium extraction in the region, which depletes the groundwater of the endorheic basin. The communities are to own and administer the site and retain all admission income under a model of low-impact, community-led tourism; organisers estimated 100 to 350 visitors per day.

A related installation, Towards the Sanctuary of Water (2026), formed the centre of Saraceno's 2026 exhibition at Haus der Kunst.

=== Tomás Saraceno In Collaboration: Web(s) of Life, Serpentine Gallery, London, 2023 ===
Tomás Saraceno in Collaboration - Web(s) of Life, which will run from 1 June to 10 September 2023 at the Serpentine Galleries and Royal Parks in London, is the first major UK exhibition of Saraceno and collaborators.

In collaboration with the interspecies communities of Salinas Grandes and Laguna de Guayatayoc, Argentina, Somié, Cameroon, Aerocene, Arachnophilia, and the Royal Parks, Web(s) of Life will examine the entanglement of life forms, extractive technologies and energy regimes within the context of the climate emergency. Web(s) of Life encourages visitors to engage with the practice of noticing bioindicators: organisms that can signal various climatic and ecological shifts. The show, as Christina Petridou notes, "invites spectators to reflect on the significant impacts of local actions, digital memory, and consumer capitalism".

Speaking of the ethos embedded into the exhibition, Saraceno asks: "In the context of the environmental crisis and the need for a just, eco-social, energy transition, can techno-diversity and biodiversity interact differently? Can systems of power move beyond the inequalities of capitalism and the reproduction of neocolonial extractivism of minerals and data? Can the privilege of digital memories over ancestral memories be overcome? Enter the spider's dream, a space with codes of another ritual… It is high time some of us change our habits and not the climate!".

In Web(s) of Life, the infrastructure of the Serpentine's buildings will be altered to consider animals, plants and humans of all ages: with temperature and humidity controls deactivated, spiders will be present, spinning their webbed pavilions throughout the exhibition space. Alongside the immersive experience of web installations, participants can log on nggamdu.org, a web portal for an ancient ritual of spider divination Saraceno developed for local diviner Bollo Pierre Tadios with Arachnophilia in collaboration with the anthropologist David Zeitlyn.

The exhibition will also feature a filmic installation, celebrating the extensive collaboration between Aerocene and other environmental collectives. Within the Royal Parks, the site's diversity of birds, insects, plants and other species will be engaged with via interactive sculptures. Speaking to Saraceno's ongoing arachnology projects, namely Arachnophilia, the exhibition will serve as a further exploration and celebration of the detailed architectural wonders created by the spiders.

=== Oceans of Air, Museum of Old and New Art, Tasmania, 2022 ===
Oceans of Air, Saraceno's 2022 solo show at the Museum of Old and New Art, Tasmania, features ethereal aerosolar sculptures, samples of invisible particle pollution collected from Mumbai's skies, radio waves beamed from First Nations Argentina, along with dust particles from the museum and across Australia.

This exhibition also features works which demonstrate Saraceno's ongoing arachnology project, Arachnophilia. Within the gallery space of MONA, Saraceno installed a series of interlacing webs which act as living structures, charting how as spiders move through space, they leave behind 'a material memory and diagram of the spider's drift through the air'.

Mona curator Emma Pike notes how "Tomás is a collector of perspectives, looking at the world through many eyes… he is as invested in the conversations which form the foundation of his works as he is in their astonishing outcomes. As a recovering arachnophobe, I have Tomás's gentle and beautiful interspecies collaborations to thank for reminding me of my own connectedness, from pollution particles to sound waves to the cosmos."

Oceans of Air also features new, site-specific work commissioned for the gallery: herbarium diptych works, created from plant specimens gathered from Hobart, notably cultural burning locations and places affected by bushfires and hazard-reduction efforts.

Also featured in Oceans of Air is We do not all breathe the same air (2018–ongoing), a piece created using a Beta Attenuation Mass Monitor (BAM). Hourly pushing air through a glass fiber strip, the machine produces lines of dots on to paper, dots whose colors vary depending on quantity and type of particles floating in the air at each given moment. The work encapsulates one of the key themes of Saraceno's work: making the invisible, visible.

=== Particular Matter(s), The Shed, New York, 2022 ===
Particular Matter(s) at The Shed, New York, is Tomás Saraceno's largest solo show in the US to date, featuring interactive installations and levitating sculptures that center on Saraceno's artistic and philosophical focus on human and non-human collaboration, planetary cohabitation and mutual interdependence.

The show begins with Webs of At-tent(s)-ion (2018), with visitors stepping through a blackout curtain into almost complete darkness; the first moment in which the show requires radical visual adjustment from the visitors, or as Sarah-Rose Hansen puts it, "'dark adaptation', a scientific term used to refer to the physiological process of pupil dilation and rod activation that allows the human eye to see at night." As visitors adjust to their new photic settings, they are confronted with seven spot-lit spiderwebs encased in glass display cases. Orchestrating a contemplative ambience, visitors move semi-visibly between the sculptures, pausing to reflect on the wall texts which articulate the exhibition's overarching theme: the need for collaboration and cohabitation of humans and nonhumans alike within the entangled Capitalocene era in which we find ourselves. As the gallery voices in their description, "blurring the boundaries between inside and outside, Webs of At-tent(s)ion is an invitation to attune ourselves to collaboratively imagined futures, grounded in principles of collective care and hope as practiced and maintained by certain communities all over the world, and to the radical interconnectedness of all beings with whom we share this "damaged planet," both living and nonliving.".

In the second gallery, visitors meet the exhibition's eponymous work, Particular Matter(s)(2020), consisting of a beam of light that illuminates the "cosmic dust" floating in the gallery's atmosphere. Aimed at the entrance, the beam forces the viewers to undergo a rapid dark to light adaptation, before transitioning back into the darkness that fills the remainder of the room. Akin to Webs of At-tent(s)-ion (2018), the darkness seeks to create a space that, without steering towards somberness, allows for tender reflection in which viewers can meditate on deeper philosophical questions around ecology and the climate emergency. Following into the next room, the exhibition's nocturnal atmosphere persists with Saraceno's Shed commission, We Do Not All Breathe the Same Air (2019–2022), which deals with the socio-political questions of climate inequality embedded within scientific studies of air pollution. This piece sits alongside Arachnomancy Cards (2018–2022), Saraceno's accompanying card deck for his Arachnomancy App, centered on invertebrate rights and Arachnophilia.

The exhibition also features Sounding the Air (2020) and How to entangle the universe in a spider/web, before viewers gravitate towards the faint lighting surrounding and reflected from Saraceno's large silver spheres which make up A Thermodynamic imaginary (2020). In this work, viewers are invited to meditate on the ecological interconnectivity running throughout our universe. As The Shed notes, "in the dispersal of light, visitors confuse their shadows with their neighbors' as gestures overlap, mirror, and intersect in a black-and-white scenography. Bodies and sculptures merge with the other entities in the room, be they human or non-human, organic or constructed."

Continuing with the exhibition's photic transition, light takes center stage in Free the Air: How to hear the universe in a spider/web (2022). Commissioned by The Shed specifically for this show, the piece consists of a spider/web concert and multisensory performance inside the McCourt. Spanning 39 meters in diameter, a huge sculpture of mesh netting expands throughout the gallery space, a structure onto which visitors are invited to explore in order to experience the concert in which shakers emit the representation of usually inaudible frequencies created by spiders' vibrations.

The final work presented in Particular Matter(s) is Museo Aero Solar (2007), a gigantic balloon constructed from crowd sourced plastic bags, which stands as a stark juxtaposition of vibrant color when viewed in relation to the darkness of the exhibition's initial rooms. Through finishing the show with a brightly lit room in which one of Saraceno's most iconic works allows visitors to consider the potential for meaningful planetary adaptation, Saraceno invites visitors to exit the show carrying a desire to embrace a call to action.

=== Silent Autumn, Tanya Bonakdar Gallery, New York, 2022 ===
In Silent Autumn, Saraceno invites viewers to interact with a new body of works that emphasize how a more ecologically measured interaction with non-human species can open up new possibilities for a more equitable and sustainable planetary co-existence. In the gallery space, Saraceno presents works that connect viewers with a multitude of interspecies realities, encouraging us to connect intimately with non-human beings and phenomena.

Emblematic of Saraceno's multiple ongoing arachnology projects, Silent Autumn features Algo-r(h)i(y)thms (2018), an intricate web of threads that examines spiders' non-verbal communication, demonstrating how spiders employ vibrational perception as an adaptational skill to utilize their environment. As Daniel Creahan notes, "through the act of playing, visitors shape a constantly evolving collaborative musical composition through touching the strings of the web, producing vibrations that echo spiderly modes of communication."

Silent Autumn also features two projected video works, WEBSDR (2018) and The Politics Of Solar Rhythms: Cosmic Levitation (2018), which both examine "vibrational phenomena occurring at scales both cosmic and microscopic".

Silent Spring (2022), a series of glass panels in which pressed poppy flowers are exhibited, momentarily transports visitors from the gallery to Saraceno's studio in Berlin-Rummelsburg where the flowers were taken from. Located on a site formerly polluted by the building's former resident, a photographic film and dye manufacturer, the soil surrounding Saraceno's studio retains traces of chemical colonization: in attempting to reproduce color pigments of nature, residual chemicals were deposited into the factory's grounds, contaminating adjacent soils, rendering all fruits of the soil inedible and forever altering the color of its landscape. In reference to Rachel Carson's eponymous 1962 publication, Silent Spring gently embodies Saraceno's critique of our Capitalocene's approach to nature as an inexhaustible well of material resources.

Other works featured in this exhibition are the blown glass works Pneuma, Aeolus, Aeroscale, Aerosolar Serpens (2018-2021), as well as Saraceno's filter paper strip work, Calendrier Lun-AIR de Paris (2018) and An Open Letter for Invertebrate Rights (2020).

=== Webs of Life, Serpentine Gallery, London, 2021 ===
In Webs of Life, Saraceno encourages viewers to move from arachnophobia to arachnophilia, the title of his ongoing arachnological project. With the use of Augmented Reality (AR) technology, viewers are able to engage with two giant AR spiders; Maratus speciosus, often referred to as the peacock spider because of its colored markings, and Bagheera kiplingi, the world's only vegetarian spider. As with many of Saraceno's works, the exhibition aims to raise awareness for the protection of biodiversity in an age of climate emergency.

Via the Arachnophilia app, a smaller, mobile version of the spiders can be viewed via a smartphone, regardless of location, in exchange for a photo of a spider or web that the user themselves has located. By asking the viewer to look for spiders, Saraceno invites the users to consider their environments and relationships to the spiders that might inhabit them. By contributing photos to the Arachnophilia network, each user contributes resource of arachnology contained within the app.

Informed by Yuk Hui's idea of technodiversity, Webs of Life invites viewers to engage, maintain, and strive for greater interspecies cohabitation. As academic Jan Hogan writes of Saraceno's work, "Tomás Saraceno imagines a future where humans become as sensitive to the environment as a spider in its web. He invites visitors to become participants in his multiple networks and projects. He aims to make us aware of our interconnections with each other and the world."

=== Movement, Maison Ruinart, Reims, 2021 ===
In Movement, Tomás Saraceno launched an Aerocene Backpack above the vineyards in Champagne: guided by the region's winds, the backpack traced a flight path in the clouds above Maison Ruinart, creating a unique Aeroglypth. This aerial sculpture, now a permanent installation above the vineyards, can be accessed by viewers through the Aerocene app.

After encountering Saraceno's work at the Palais de Tokyo in 2018, Ruinart planned a collaboration that would explore the climate emergency and its damaging effects on our environment.The performance of Movement commenced with a short meditation and poetic reading, followed by the launch of Saraceno's geothermic sculpture above Maison Ruinart.

Movement echoes Saraceno's ongoing concern with the politics of air, a concern shared deeply by Ruinart: the slightest change in atmospheric conditions can have devastating effects on the region's harvest, an omnipresent threat the winemaker's know is set to increase in our age of climate emergency.

=== On Air, Palais de Tokyo, Paris, 2018 ===
On Air is Saraceno's 2018 solo exhibition at the Palais de Tokyo, Paris. Described by the gallery as "an ecosystem in becoming, hosting emergent choreographies and polyphonies across human and non-human universes, where artworks reveal the common, fragile and ephemeral rhythms and trajectories between these worlds", the show aims to magnify the myriad of voices often not heard by human ears. Featuring artworks, workshops, concerts and public symposiums, the atmosphere of On Air threads together a multi-faceted web of relations which are felt without necessarily being verbalized, aiming to move us from an Anthropocene to a post-fossil Aerocene society.

The exhibition features the projection The politics of solar rhythms: Cosmic Levitation (2018), in which particles of dust cluster together, guided by vibrational rhythms of sonic frequencies. The experiment, proposed by Saraceno to the Jaeger Lab at the University of Chicago, questions how acoustic levitation — which suspends particles in the air and examines how measured vibrations from sound waves can aggregate matter — could be used to levitate meteorite particles. Such controlled sound waves oscillate at key frequencies, causing specific particles of dust to levitate, examining the relationship between rhythm and cosmic creation.

One of the central works of On Air is Algo-r(h)i(y)thms, a huge webbed structure composed of thin ropes of differing lengths. Invited to interact directly with the artwork, visitors can "play" the strings which create sonic patterns via the tiny microphones attached to them. As Elda Oreto notes, when played by multiple participants, the structures "produce frequencies similar to those of micro and macroscopic scientific phenomena: from reproducing the signal of courtship of spiders to the melodies of the electrons of galactic nebula." In an interview with Ignant, Saraceno notes that Algo-r(h)i(y)thms is "an exercise in establishing a communication with something that is distant, inaudible, but which we are a part of… a non-verbal dialogue, a jamming session."

Also featured is Sounding the Air, an aeolian instrument constructed from threads of spider silk which are triggered by the wind and resonate in the air. Live video captures the instrument's movements, converting them into sonic patterns which illuminate Webs of At-tent(s)ion, creating a multi-sensorial conversation between the two works. Directly influenced by the visitors' movements, conversations and breathing, along with other multi-elemental forces, the work's sonic architectures are constantly in flux, being continuously re-written via the innumerous presences inhabiting the gallery space.

In Passages of Time, dust and other air particles are live-streamed from the gallery's atmosphere — forming part of the installation Particular Matter(s) Jam Session — and also features a 163,000 year-long video (the length of time it takes for light emitted by the Large Magellanic to reach Earth. Only visible at night in the southern hemisphere, we receive a vision of this spiral galaxy with a 163,000 year delay. Recorded at the salt flats in Uyuni, Bolivia, the video invites us to reconsider our linear notion of time through examining the way airborne matter is influenced by our movements, and how these particles navigate through space directly in relation to our alternating velocities.

The exhibition also features the following works: Hybrid Webs (2018), Living at the bottom of the ocean of air (2018), How to entangle the universe in a spider/web (2018) and Printed Matter(s) (2018).

=== 58th International Art Exhibition - La Biennale di Venezia, Venice, Italy, 2019 ===
In Aero(s)cene, when breath becomes air, when atmospheres become the movement for a post fossil fuel era against carbon-capitalist clouds (2019), Saraceno communicates directly with the surrounding environmental choreography of Venice, visualizing — through a series of installation works — the climate emergency, both on a global scale and in direct relation to the immediate topography.

On the Disappearance of Clouds (2019) — a suspended aerial theater — together with Acqua Alta: en Clave de Sol(2019), a sonic installation which takes its cue from Venice's high water alarm system, exist in open communication with the movements of Venice's surrounding tides. Shifting with the sounds of water beneath the sculpture, which in turn is moved by the wind and the moon's gravitational pull, Saraceno's multi-sensorial installation encourages viewers to consider the threat of rising sea levels while simultaneously inviting them to consider their position in relation to the climate emergency.

In reference to Aerocene, a global community working towards a new global network of interconnected, borderless and post-fossil communities, both works invite viewers to imagine a balanced and ethical cohabitation with our atmosphere.

As writer and editor Ann Souter notes, "by making global warming both visible and audible, Saraceno highlights our reciprocal relationship with the elements and suggests alternative ways of responding to our predicament.

=== Cloud Cities ===
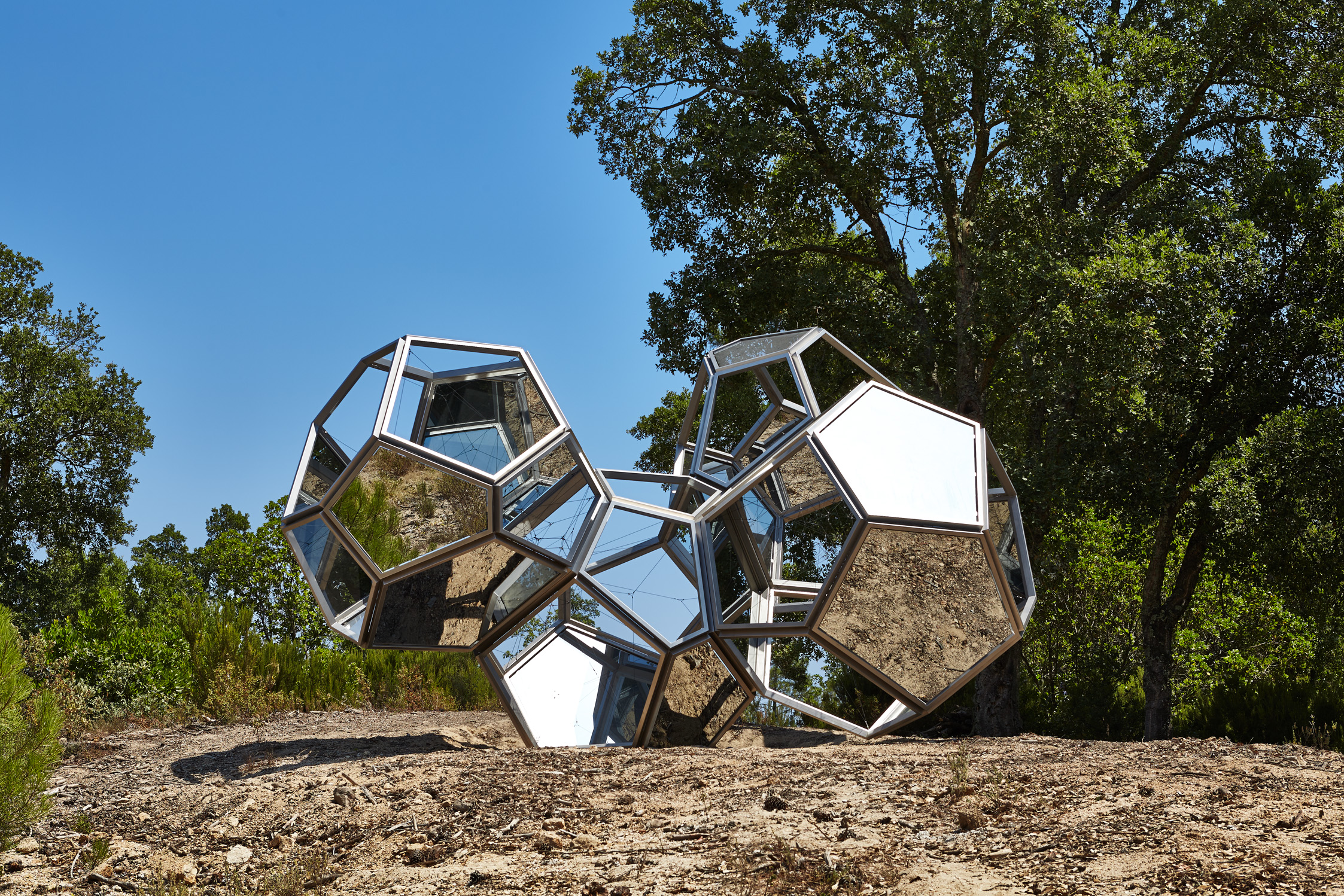
Tomás Saraceno, Air-Port-City / Cloud Cities, 2010. Domaine du Muy, France

Saraceno's long-term artistic research project (2002–present) draws inspiration from Buckminster Fuller and other radical architects. The aim of the project is to create a modular, transnational city in the clouds, the realization of which would be a new model for liberating and sustainable building practices.

The exhibition Cloud Cities, presented at Hamburger Bahnhof - Museum für Gegenwart in Berlin (2011–12), consisted of a collection of geometric, inflated shapes that challenge the notions of place, space, future and gravity. Through the exhibition, Saraceno sought to explain how human beings live in combination with their environment. As curator and art historian Moritz Wesseler notes, "an aspect that is of great importance to Saraceno in this context is that the city's shape and size can be changed continually, subjecting conventional ideas about boundaries and territories to critical scrutiny. (...) The works he creates as part of this exploration can be considered components of sorts for the future cloud-city that can be assembled to create the desired complex in its entirety. But the components also exist in isolation, as independent sculptures or installations, evincing forces and qualities of their own that render them highly fascinating constructs."

=== Observatory/Airport City ===
Related to Cloud Cities, Saraceno launched an exhibition 'Observatory/Air-Port-City' at the Hayward Gallery, London (2008). The exhibition was composed of a collection of spheres, each housing autonomous residential units. The network of habitable cells float in the air, combining and recombining like clouds, constructing a flying airport. This is Saraceno's utopic vision: to create a new airborne nomadism.

=== On the Roof: Cloud City ===
Saraceno exhibited 'On the Roof: Cloud City' in the Iris and B Gerald Cantor Roof Garden at the Metropolitan Museum of Art (MET) New York City (2012). This consisted of a constellation of sixteen large, interconnected modules composed of glass segments and cut in non-identical geometric shapes held in place by steel joints, reinforcements and steel cables. Visitors were able to walk through the installation, which draws its shape from bacteria, clouds, universes, foam and neural communication networks.

=== In Orbit ===
In Orbit, installed since June 2013 at K21 Ständehaus, Düsseldorf, spans Saraceno's inquiries into urbanism, natural engineering and communication. Curated by Marion Ackermann, the installation hangs more than 25 meters above the piazza of the K21. Saraceno's installation combines the structure of a spider's web with the vision of Cloud Cities. Over 400,000 visitors to the exhibition have strolled, climbed, laid, on a 2,500 sqm web, dotted with massive inflated PVC spheres. The movement of each participant is felt by others, exhibiting a potential for new modes of human communication.

=== On Space Time Foam ===
'On Space Time Foam', an installation by Saraceno and curated by Andrea Lissoni, was inspired by the cubic shape of the exhibition space at HangarBicocca, Milan, appearing there in 2013. The structure was composed of three levels of thin, clear film fixed to the walls and floating at a height of 14 to 20 metres, covering an area of 400 square metres. Visitors were granted access to three levels of the artwork, finding themselves in mid-air, encouraging the loss of spatial coordination. HangarBicocca has a cubic form.

The cube, a geometric form often used by scientists to represent the concepts of space and time, inspired Saraceno to create an installation in which the visitors' movements enact the time variable, thereby introducing the concept of the fourth dimension within the three-dimensional space. The title of the work can be traced to quantum mechanics on the origins of the universe, distinguished by the idea of extremely fast-moving subatomic particles that can trigger changes in spatio-temporal matter. Freely inspired by these theories, Saraceno makes their movements metaphorically visible. The installation is a device that calls perceptual certainties into question; it is an element that modifies the architecture containing it, a structure that makes the interrelationships among people and visible space, an attempt to overcome the laws of gravity. As the artist explained, "the films constituting the living core of HangarBicocca are constantly altered by climate and the simple movement of people. Each step, each breath, modifies the entire space: it is a metaphor for how our interrelations affect the Earth and other universes."

=== Solar Bell ===
Saraceno has developed a Solar Bell flying sculpture made of lightweight and sustainable materials. Its design is based on the modular tetrahedron, or four-sided pyramid, invented by Alexander Graham Bell during his early investigations into manned flight. Bell made important discoveries in the field of aviation and frame construction, and happened upon the strongest geometrical structure known in the cosmos, the octet truss. This was the same spaceframe that Buckminster Fuller later followed for his Geodesic dome. 'Solar Bell' was the final project in a series of artworks created to accompany the expansion of the Port of Rotterdam with the construction of Maasvlakte 2 in the Netherlands in 2013. Solar Bell Ensemble, Contemporary Arts Center, Cincinnati, USA 2016.

=== Flying Plaza ===
Inspired by Solar Bell, Saraceno developed the idea of entire cities built upon lighter-than-air structures and sustainable energy technologies, lifted by the wind and suspended above the surface of the Earth. This 'flying plaza' represents an inquiry into public space, which according to Saraceno's vision, can be erected in alternative and fossil-free ways. Saraceno imagines spaces of dwellings as new urban skyscapes: flying buildings elevated by wind power alone, which erase the boundaries defined by geopolitics, and start to respond to local specificities.

=== Stillness in Motion - Cloud Cities ===
Stillness in Motion — Cloud Cities, was launched by Saraceno and curated by Joseph Becker at the San Francisco Museum of Modern Art (SFMoMA), San Francisco in 2016. Organized by the SFMOMA Architecture and Design department, the exhibition comprises an immersive, site-specific cloudscape installation of suspended tension structures and floating sculptures, as well as explorations of the intricate constructions of spider webs.

=== Cloud Cities Barcelona ===
Cloud Cities Barcelona is located in Mirador Torre Glòries in Barcelona, the artist’s only permanent installation in Europe. This work is made up of 113 spaces that symbolize condensed water droplets, forming a 130 m³ structure accessible to visitors of the observation deck.

The structure is suspended from the dome of the Mirador by 6 kilometers of tensioned cable connected through 5,000 nodes, and visitors can explore its interior across different levels ranging from 4 to 10 meters above the floor of the space.

With Cloud Cities Barcelona, Saraceno invites reflection on interdependence and the relationships between living beings and their environment, represented by the movement of people within the sculpture’s confined space, where each person’s movement affects everyone else.

In 2025 Saraceno was named one of seven artists commissioned for the New Terminal One at John F. Kennedy International Airport, a terminal developed with the Port Authority of New York and New Jersey that is opening in phases from 2026. His contribution, Cloud Cities New York, is a monumental suspended sculpture of iridescent forms from the Cloud Cities series.

== Exhibitions ==
Saraceno's work has been widely exhibited internationally in solo and group exhibitions. Most notably, these include:

- Tomás Saraceno in Collaboration: Ancestral Futures (German: Verwobene Welten), Haus der Kunst, Munich, curated by Andrea Lissoni and Sarah Theurer (2026–2027).
- Complementarities at Red Brick Art Museum, Beijing, China, curated by Shijie Yan (2024)
- Particular Matter(s) at The Shed, New York, curated by Emma Enderby (2022).
- We do not all breathe the same air, neugerriemschneider gallery, Berlin (2021).
- AnarcoAracnoAnacroArcano, Parco Archeologico della Neapolis, Syracuse, curated by Paolo Falcone (2021).
- Du Sol au Soleil, Domaine des Etangs, Massignac, curated by Rebecca Lamarche-Vadel /2021).
- Event Horizon: Tomás Saraceno at Cisternerne, Copenhagen (2020).
- Aria, at Palazzo Strozzi, Florence, Italy, curated by Arturo Galansino (2020)
- Aero(s)cene: When breath becomes air, when atmospheres become the movement for a post fossil fuel era against carbon-capitalist clouds and Spider/Web Pavilion 7, at "May you live in interesting times", Venice Biennale, curated by Ralph Rugoff (2019).
- ON AIR, Carte blanche to Tomás Saraceno at Palais de Tokyo, curated by Rebecca Lamarche-Vadel (2018-2019).
- In orbit, at Kunstsammlung Nordrhein-Westfalen K21, Düsseldorf (2013-2016, 2017- ongoing).
- Aerocene, at Solutions COP21, Grand Palais, Paris (2015).
- Arachnid Orchestra. Jam Sessions, at NTU Centre for Contemporary Art Singapore (2015).
- Cloud Cities, at Hamburger Bahnhof, Berlin (2011–12).
- On the Roof: Cloud City, at The Metropolitan Museum of Art, New York (2012).

== Permanent installations ==
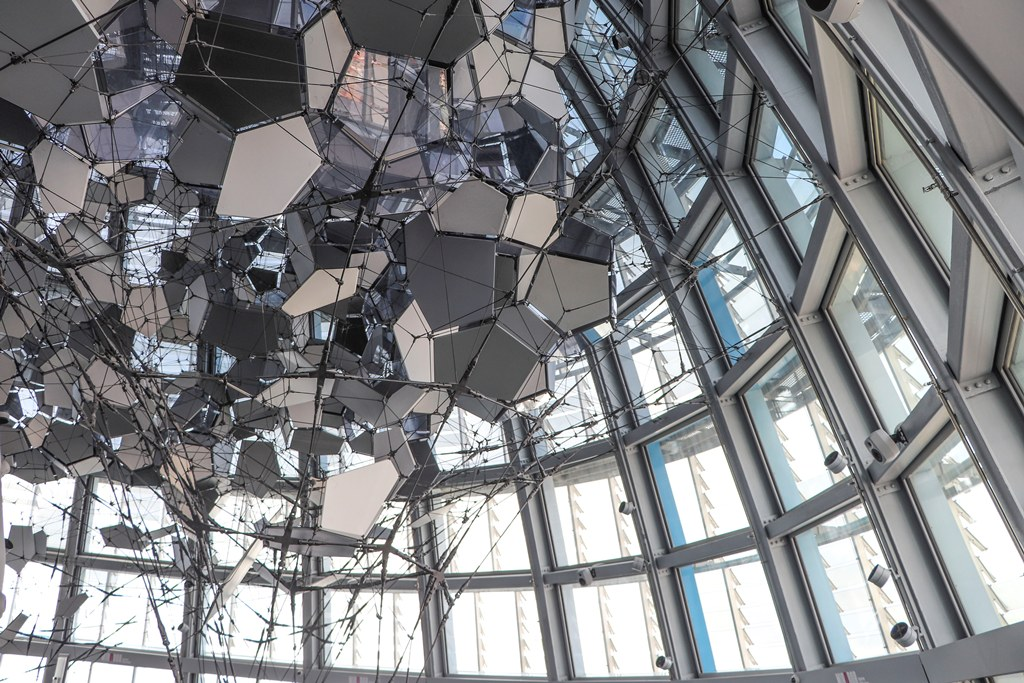
Cloud Cities Barcelona, Torre Glories

- Forthcoming, Cloud Cities New York, New Terminal One, John F. Kennedy International Airport, New York, USA.
- 2022, Cloud Cities Barcelona, torre Glòries, Barcelona, Spain.
- 2019, Sundial for Spatial Echoes, Bauhaus Museum Weimar, Weimar, Germany.
- 2017, Gravitational Waves, Z33 Kunstencentrum, Genk, Belgium.
- 2017, Stillness in Motion - 3 Airborne Self-Assemblies, Singapore, Singapore.
- 2017, Cloud Cities – Nebulous Thresholds, Rollins College, Florida, USA.
- 2017, On Cosmic Clouds, NYU Abu Dhabi Library, Abu Dhabi, UAE.
- 2016, Cloud Cities: HAT-P-12, Taipei, Taiwan.
- 2016, Caelum Dust, University of South Florida, Tampa, USA.
- 2015, Cloud Cities / Air-Port-City, Domaine du Muy, Parc de sculptures contemporaines, France.
- 2015, Sundial for Spatial Echoes, Aker Brygge, Oslo, Norway.
- 2008, On clouds (Air-Port-City), Towada Art Center, Towada, Japan.
- 2007, Flying Garden, European Patent Office (EPO) Munich, Germany.

== Collections ==
Saraceno's work is represented in public and private collections including:

- Miami Art Museum, Miami, FL, USA.
- Museum für Moderne Kunst, Frankfurt, Germany.
- Klassik Stiftung Weimar, Weimar, Germany.
- Museum of Modern Art, New York, USA.
- San Francisco Museum of Modern Art, San Francisco, CA, USA.
- Walker Art Center, Minneapolis, MN, USA.
- Nationalgalerie, Staatliche Museen zu Berlin, Berlin, Germany.
- Bonniers Konsthall, Stockholm, Sweden.
- The National Gallery of Denmark, Copenhagen, Denmark.
- Esbjerg Kunstmusem, Esbjerg, Denmark.
- Istanbul Modern Art Museum, Istanbul, Turkey.
- Hamburger Bahnhof – Museum für Gegenwart, Berlin, Germany.
- Boros Collection, Berlin, Germany.
- The Collection of Juan Vergez, Buenos Aires, Argentina.
- BSI Art Collection, Switzerland.
- Mudam Musée d'Art Moderne Grand-Duc Jean, Luxembourg.
- Collezione La Gaia, Busca, Italy.
- Fondazione Pierluigi e Natalina Remotti, Camogli, Italy.
- Fondazione Morra Greco, Naples, Italy.
- Fondazione Edoardo Garrone, Genoa, Italy.
- Luma Foundation, Zurich, Switzerland.
- Reykjavik Art Museum, Reykjavik, Iceland.

== Publications ==
- Sanctuary of Water: Tomás Saraceno in Collaboration with Red Atacama. Edited by Sarah Johanna Theurer and Studio Tomás Saraceno. Archive Books, 2026. ISBN 978-3-912226-24-9
- Cloud Cities Barcelona. Edited by Studio Tomás Saraceno and Space Caviar. Asinello Press and Space Caviar, 2025. ISBN 978-1-0369-1585-8
- Life(s) of Webs, Arachnophobias, Arachnophilias, and Other Stories. NERO Editions, 2024. ISBN 978-88-8056-294-8
- AnarcoAracnoAnacroArcano. Edited by Paolo Falcone. Electa, 2024. ISBN 978-88-928-2114-9
- Web(s) of Life. Edited by Lizzie Carey-Thomas and Chris Bayley. Ivorypress, 2023. ISBN 978-84-122792-2-1
- Spiders in Motion, Rainy Commotion. Ivorypress, 2023. ISBN 978-84-122792-8-3
- Aerocene Newspaper II. The Aerocene Foundation, 2023.
- Oceans of Air. Edited by Beth Hall, Jane Clark and Luke Hortle. Mona, 2023. ISBN 978-0-6487859-4-1
- From Arachnophobia to Arachnophilia. Edited by May Castleberry. Museum of Modern Art, 2022.
- Particular Matter(s). The Shed and Verlag der Buchhandlung Walther und Franz König, 2022.
- Aria. Edited by Studio Tomás Saraceno. Marsilio Editori, 2020. ISBN 978-88-297-0364-7
- Event Horizon. Edited by Sara Hatla and Astrid la Cour. Frederiksberg Museums, 2020. ISBN 978-87-971282-1-3
- Songs for the Air. Edited by Martin Faass and Hanna Belz. Hessisches Landesmuseum Darmstadt, 2020.
- Aerocene – Movements for the Air, Munich Landing. Edited by Alice Lamperti and Roxanne Mackie. The Aerocene Foundation, 2020. ISBN 978-3-00-064721-5
- Palais #28: On Air. Edited by Tomás Saraceno. Palais de Tokyo, 2018. ISBN 978-2-84711-106-4
- Marble Breeze. Edited by Tariq Heijboer. thr34d5 and Aerocene, 2018.
- How to Entangle the Universe in a Spider Web. Museo de Arte Moderno de Buenos Aires, 2018. ISBN 978-987-1358-52-6
- Aerographies. Fosun Foundation Shanghai; China Science Literature Publishing House, 2018. ISBN 978-988-78710-1-9
- Our Interplanetary Bodies. Asia Culture Center, 2018. ISBN 979-11-962284-2-2
- The Work of the Wind: Land. With Etienne Turpin and Christine Shaw. K. Verlag, 2018.
- Guest editor, Wallpaper, 2018.
- Aerosolar Journeys. Edited by Sabine Schaschl and René Zechlin. Walther König, 2017. ISBN 978-3-96098-182-4
- Notes on Aerocene. Studio Tomás Saraceno and The Aerocene Foundation, 2017.
- Aerocene. Edited by Studio Tomás Saraceno. Skira, 2017. ISBN 88-572-3473-8
- Flying Plaza: Work Journal 2012–2016. Edited by Philipp Oswalt. Spector Books, 2017. ISBN 978-3-95905-029-6
- Arachnid Orchestra. Jam Sessions. Edited by Ute Meta Bauer and Anca Rujoiu. NTU Centre for Contemporary Art Singapore, 2017. ISBN 978-981-11-3047-2
- Aerocene. Exhibition Road. The Aerocene Foundation, 2017.
- Arachno Concert Reader. Studio Tomás Saraceno, 2016.
- 163,000 Light Years. Museo de Arte Contemporáneo de Monterrey, 2016. ISBN 978-607-9355-10-4
- Becoming Aerosolar. Edited by Agnes Husslein-Arco and Mario Codognato. 21er Haus, Belvedere, 2015. ISBN 978-3-902805-70-6
- Aerocene Newspaper I. The Aerocene Foundation, 2015.
- Cloud Specific. Edited by Jane E. Neidhardt. Mildred Lane Kemper Art Museum, 2014. ISBN 978-0-936316-35-2
- Cosmic Jive: The Spider Sessions. Edited by Giovanni Pezzato and Joseph Grima. Asinello Press, 2014. ISBN 978-88-909680-5-1
- Cloud Cities. With Marion Ackermann, Daniel Birnbaum, Udo Kittelmann and Hans Ulrich Obrist. Distanz, 2011. ISBN 978-3-942405-37-9
- 14 Billions (Working Title). Edited by Sara Arrhenius and Tomás Saraceno. Skira, 2011. ISBN 978-88-572-0857-2
- Cloud Cities / Air-Port-City. Edited by Juliane von Herz. Kerber Verlag, 2010. ISBN 978-3-86678-487-1

== Awards ==
- 2022, Platinum Konex Award for his work in the last decade.
- 2019, The Golden Madonnina, The Design Prize - In the artistic realm.
- 2010, 1822 Kunstpreis.
- 2009, Alexander Calder Prize.

== Personal life ==
Saraceno lives and works in Berlin.

== Online references ==
- World's first fully solar certified manned flight
- 53rd Venice Biennale
- UN Climate Change Conference Paris COP21
- L'Observatoire de l'Espace
- Department of Earth, Atmospheric and Planetary Sciences (EAPS)
- Calder Prize
- TBA21 Academy
- Museo Aero Solar
- Becoming Aerosolar
- Hayward Gallery
- Hangar Bicocca
- K21 Kunstsammlung Nordrhein-Westfalen
