= NTU Centre for Contemporary Art Singapore =

- Former name: Centre for Contemporary Art (CCA)
- Established: October 2013
- Location: Gillman Barracks, Singapore
- Director: Ute Meta Bauer

NTU Centre for Contemporary Art Singapore (NTU CCA Singapore) is a national research centre affiliated with Nanyang Technological University (NTU).

NTU CCA Singapore is located in Gillman Barracks, a visual arts precinct in Singapore. Set up in 2013, the centre is currently headed by Founding Director Ute Meta Bauer, who is also Professor at NTU's School of Art, Design and Media.

After its closure of exhibition space and residency studios in March 2021, the centre still retains its research centre and office at Block 6 Lock Road.

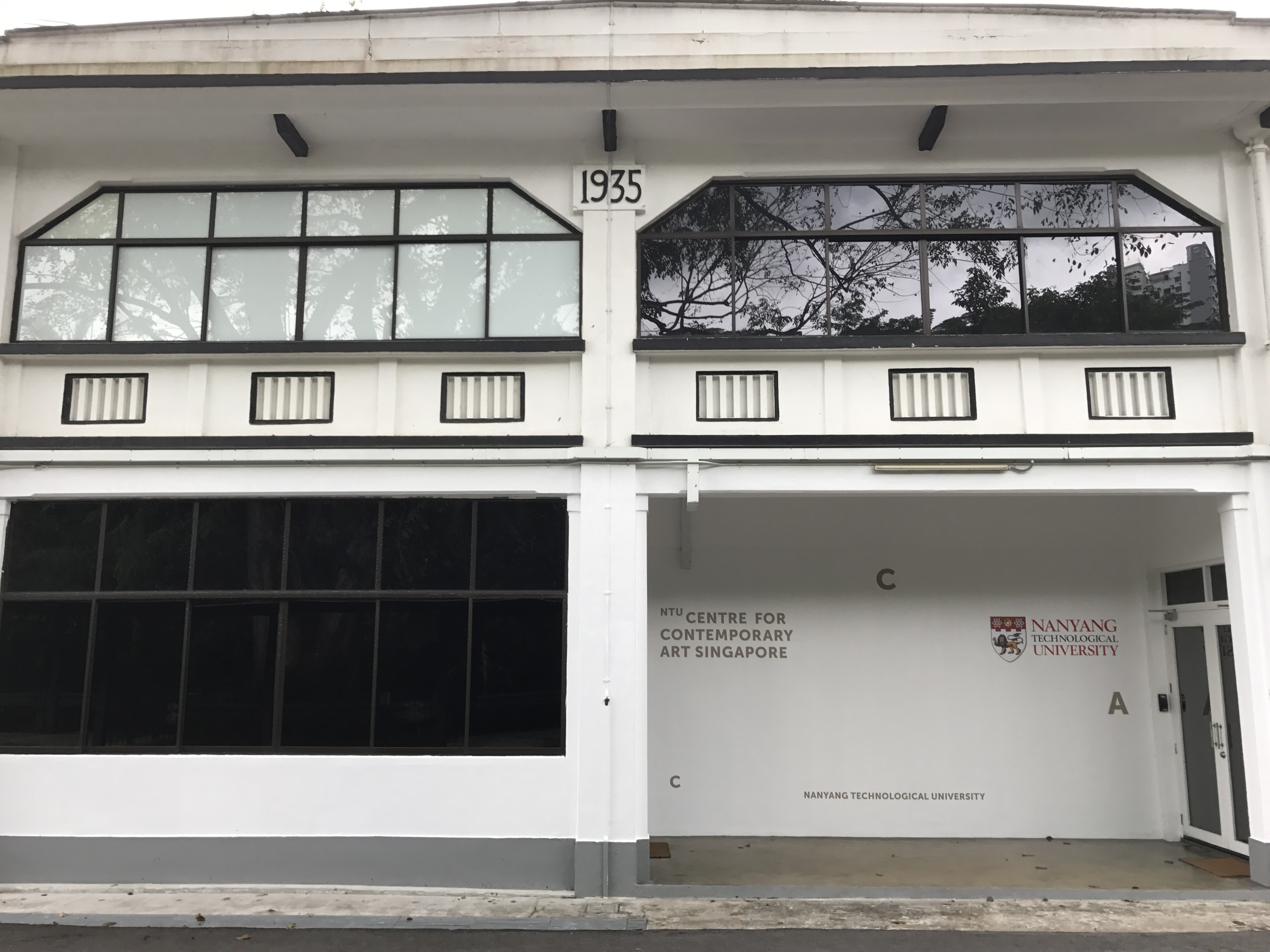
NTU CCA Singapore's research centre and main office at Block 6 Lock Road, Gillman Barracks.

== History ==
Initially named as the Centre for Contemporary Arts (CCA) in October 2013, it became operational more than a year after Gillman Barracks officially launched on 15 September 2012. The centre consisted of four buildings: the exhibition hall at Block 43 Malan Road, artist studios at Block 38 and 37 Malan Road, and the research centre and main office at Block 6 Lock Road. In 2014, the artist residency programme was announced, with its inaugural batch of residents consisting of Singaporeans Charles Lim, Ana Prvacki and Lee Wen, as well as Sam Durant, Tiffany Chung, Mona Vatamanu and Florin Tudor.

The centre was also credited for "rais[ing] the game" in Gillman Barracks by hosting the touring exhibition of the Guggenheim’s collection of South and Southeast Asian contemporary art in 2014, reviving flagging visitor numbers to the gallery precinct. The Centre's Public Resource Centre—a library with a focus on Southeast Asian contemporary art—and Artist Resource Platform were set up in 2015. In April 2017, the Centre was added to the editorial team of Afterall journal.

The closure of exhibition space and residency studios was announced in March 2021 after funding from the Economic Development Board ceased.

== Exhibitions ==
2017: Ulrike Ottinger: China. The Arts – The People, Photographs and Films from the 1980s and 1990s (curated by Ute Meta Bauer and Khim Ong)

2017: The Making of an Institution (curated by Ute Meta Bauer, Anna Lovecchio and Anca Rujoiu)

2016: Incomplete Urbanism: Attempts of Critical Spatial Practice (featuring the work of Singaporean architect William S. W. Lim, curated by Ute Meta Bauer, Khim Ong, and Magdalena Magiera)

2016: Amar Kanwar: The Sovereign Forest, in collaboration with Sudhir Pattnaik/Samadrusti and Sherna Dastur (curated by Ute Meta Bauer, Khim Ong, and Magdalena Magiera)

2016: Charles Lim Yi Yong: SEA STATE (curated by Shabbir Hussain Mustafa)

2016: Joan Jonas: They Come to Us without a Word (first organised for the U.S. Pavilion of the 56th Venice Biennale by the MIT List Visual Arts Center and co-curated by Paul C. Ha, Director of the MIT List Visual Arts Center and Ute Meta Bauer)

2015: Tomás Saraceno: Arachnid Orchestra. Jam Sessions (curated by Ute Meta Bauer and Anca Rujoiu)

2015: Allan Sekula: Fish Story, to be continued (curated by Ute Meta Bauer and Anca Rujoiu)

2015: Simryn Gill: Hugging the Shore (curated by Ute Meta Bauer and Anca Rujoiu)

2014–5: Yang Fudong: Incidental Scripts (curated by Ute Meta Bauer with Khim Ong)

2014: Theatrical Fields (curated by Ute Meta Bauer with Anca Rujoiu, first presented and commissioned by the Bildmuseet, Umea)

2014: No Country: Contemporary Art for South and Southeast Asia (curated by June Yap, part of Guggenheim UBS MAP Global Art Initiative)

2014: The Disappearance (curated by Anca Rujoiu and Vera Mey)

2014: Paradise Lost (curated by Ute Meta Bauer and Anca Rujoiu)
