= Vera Mey =

New Zealand curator and art historian based in London

- Born: Wellington, New Zealand
- Education: SOAS University of London, Victoria University of Wellington
- Occupations: Curator, Art Historian

Vera Mey is a curator and art historian based in London. In 2024 she co-directed the Busan Biennale. She is currently Associate Professor of Contemporary Art History & Theory at the Ruskin School of Art, University of Oxford, and a Fellow of St Catherine’s College, Oxford. Previously she was faculty of the Royal College of Art and a Curatorial Research Fellow at the Manchester School of Art. Her research focusses on Southeast Asian modern and contemporary art.

== Early life and education ==
Mey was born in Wellington, New Zealand and is of Cambodian-Indonesian descent. She completed her undergraduate degree in Art History and English Literature in 2008 and her master's degree in Museum and Heritage Studies in 2011, both at the Victoria University of Wellington. In 2023 she was awarded her PhD in History of Art & Archaeology from SOAS University of London, looking at modern Southeast Asian art produced during the Cold War era.

== Career ==
=== Curatorial ===
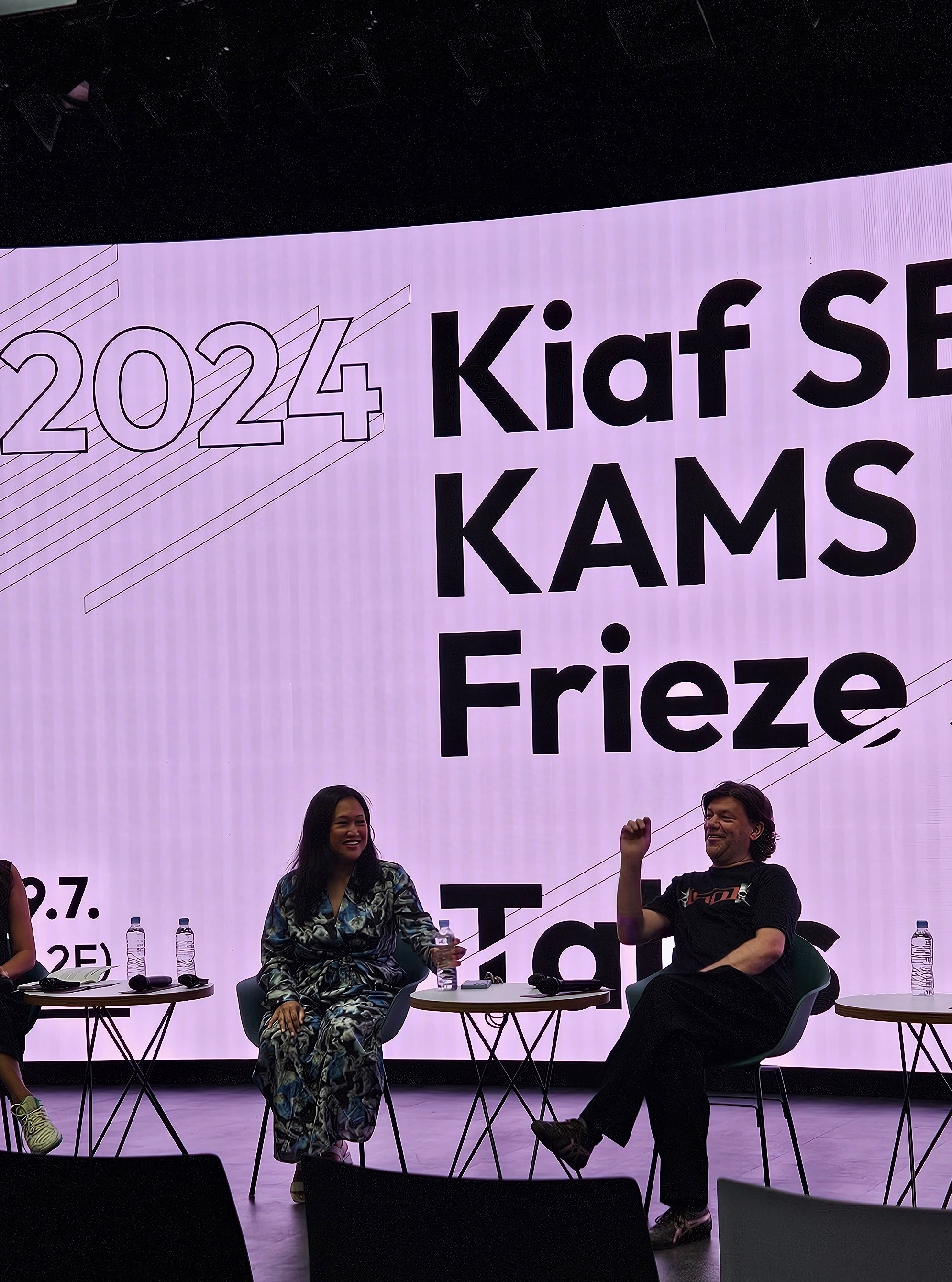
Curators Vera Mey and Philippe Pirotte on a panel at Frieze Seoul in 2024

From 2011 to 2013, Mey was the Assistant Director and Curator at St Paul St Gallery at Auckland University of Technology. In 2014 she moved to Singapore to join the founding curatorial team of the NTU Centre for Contemporary Art Singapore under director Ute Meta Bauer, where she led the residencies programme until 2016. The following year, Mey was part of the curatorial team for SUNSHOWER: Contemporary art from Southeast Asia 1980s to now, a major survey of Southeast Asian contemporary art shown at the Mori Art Museum and The National Art Center, Tokyo.

Mey was Artistic Director of the 2024 Busan Biennale alongside Belgian curator de:Philippe Pirotte. The 2024 Biennale, themed "Seeing in the Dark", brought together work by 64 artists from 36 countries. Spaces across the city were utilized, including the historic Bank of Korea building and the Museum of Contemporary Art Busan.

Mey has held the at-large position of International Programme Manager at Te Tuhi in Auckland since 2022.

=== Academic ===
In 2026 Mey was appointed Associate Professor of Contemporary Art History & Theory at the Ruskin School of Art, University of Oxford. From 2023 to 2025 Mey was Lecturer in Art Curating at the University of York. In 2023 Mey was Guest Professor for Curatorial Studies and Art History at Städelschule in Frankfurt am Main. She is a Curatorial Research Fellow at Manchester School of Art, Manchester Metropolitan University. From 2025 to 2026 she was Tutor (Research) in the Arts & Humanities MPhil/PhD and in the Curating Contemporary Art MA at the Royal College of Art.

== Publications ==
- Mey co-founded the academic journal SOUTHEAST OF NOW: Directions in Contemporary and Modern Art in 2017 and remains on the Editorial Collective.

=== Selected publications ===
- Mey, V. and Pirotte, P. (2024) Seeing in the Dark: Catalogue of the 2024 Busan Biennale. Busan: Busan Biennale.
- Mey, V. (2023) 'Hiding in Plain Sight: Pio Abad and Bringing to Light Dark Histories', in McCarthy, D. (ed.) Ashmolean Now: Pio Abad. Oxford: Ashmolean Museum, pp. 93–99.
- Mey, V. (2017) 'We're in this together', in A Year of Conscious Practice.
