= Busan Biennale =

South Korean biannual art show

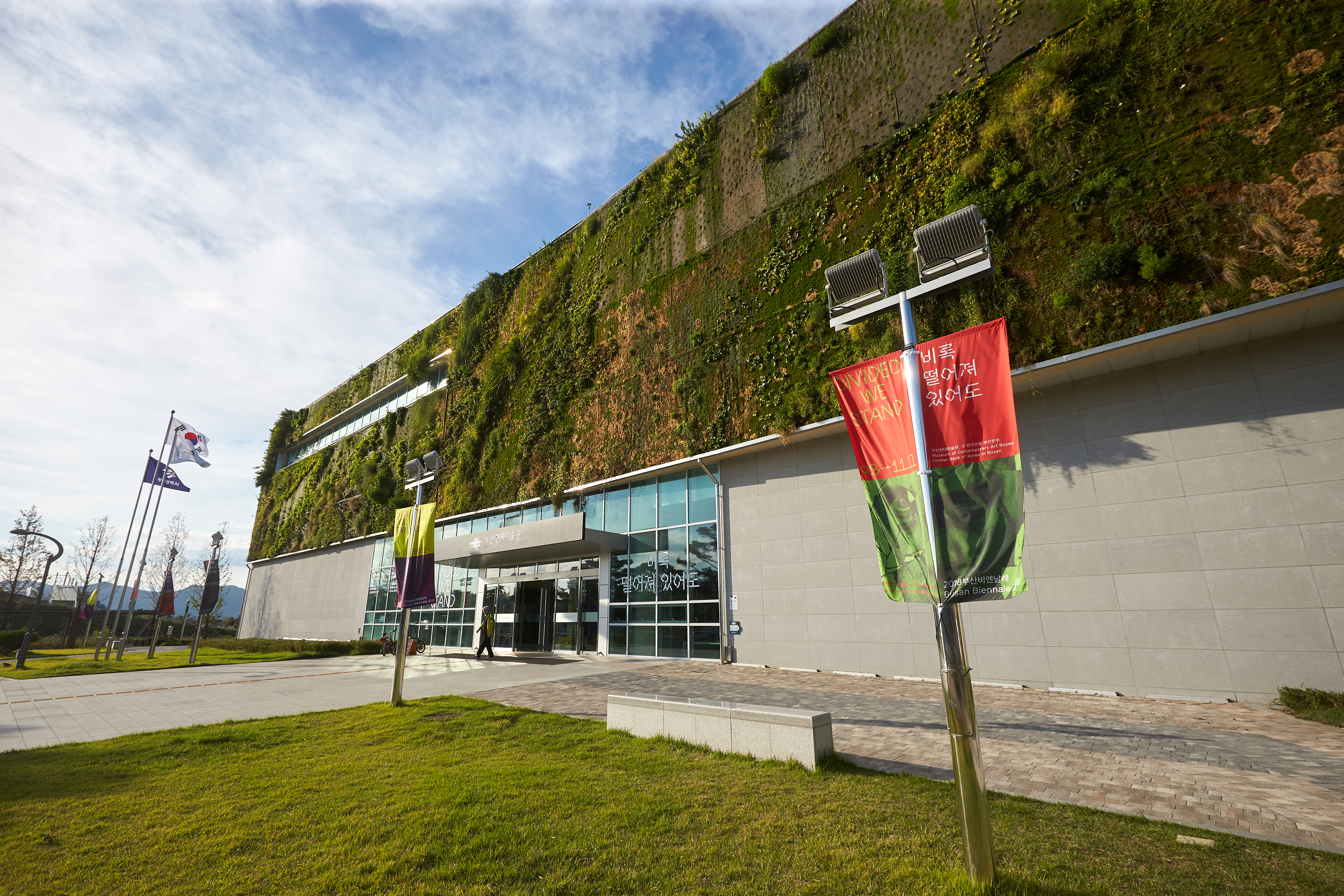
Busan Biennale 2018

The Busan Biennale is a biannual international contemporary art show held in Busan, South Korea. Busan Biennale is held in even-numbered years, and is hosted by Busan metropolitan city and Busan Biennale Organizing Committee.

== Exhibition history ==
The Busan Biennale is a biannual international contemporary art show that integrated three different art events held in the city in 1998: the Busan Youth Biennale, the first Biennale of Korea that was voluntarily organized by local artists in 1981; the Sea Art Festival, an environmental art festival launched in 1987 with the sea serving as a backdrop; and the Busan Outdoor Sculpture Symposium that was first held in 1991. The Biennale was previously called the Pusan International Contemporary Art Festival (PICAF; issues in 1998 and 2000) before it launched.

Furthermore, the Busan Biennale uses non-traditional locations, such as industrial facilities, as exhibition halls in Busan.

In the example at the top, KISWIRE Suyeong factory (it is called ‘F1963’ currently) being used for special exhibition hall and main exhibition hall for Busan Biennale 2014 and Busan Biennale 2016 respectively. As of today, F1963 branded itself as one of the most famous culture complexes in Busan. Also, it is considered as a model case of urban regeneration.

Year	Period	Venue	Director	Theme	Note
2002	Sep.15~Nov.22 (69days)	Busan Museum of Modern Art, Haeundae Beach, Asiad Sculpture Plaza, etc	Airyung Kim (Independent Curator)	Culture Meets Culture	
2004	May 22~Oct.31 (163days)	Busan Museum of Modern Art, Haeundae Beach, Eulsukdo Sculpture park, etc	Tae Man Choi (Professor, Kookmin University)	Chasm	
2006	Sep.16~Nov.25 (71days)	Busan Museum of Modern Art, Haeundae Beach, APEC Naru park, etc	Manu D. Park (Art Critic & Independent Curator)	Everywhere	
2008	Sep.6~Nov.15 (71days)	Busan Museum of Modern Art, Gwangalli Beach, APEC Naru park, etc	Won Bang Kim (Professor, Hongik University)	Expenditure	
2010	Sep.11~Nov.20 (71days)	Busan Museum of Modern Art, Busan Yachting Center, Gwangalli Beach, Busan Cultural Center, etc	Azumaya Takashi (Independent Curator)	Living in Evolution	
2012	Sep.22~Nov.24 (64days)	Busan Museum of Modern Art, Busan Yachting Center, Gwangalli Beach, Busan Cultural Center, etc	Roger M. Buergel (Independent Curator)	Garden of Learning	Separated from the Sea Art Festival and became an independent festival.
2014	Sep.20~Nov.22 (64days)	Busan Museum of Art, Busan Cultural Center, KISWIRE Sooyoung Factory, etc	Olivier Kaeppelin (Director, Fondation Maeght)	Inhabiting the World	
2016	Sep.3~Nov.30 (89 days)	Busan Museum of Art, F1963 (KISWIRE Suyeong Factory)	Yun Cheagab (Director, the How Art Museum)	Hybridizing Earth, Discussing Multitude	Launched an online platform in collaboration with Google
2018	Sep.8~Nov.11 (65 days)	Museum of Contemporary Art Busan, former Bank of Korea in Busan	Cristina Ricupero (Independent Curator), Jörg Heiser (Art Critic)	Divided We Stand	
2020	Sep.5~Nov.8 (65 days)	Museum of Contemporary Art Busan, Yeongdo Harbor, Old town (Jungang-daero)	Jacob Fabricius (Artistic Director of the Kunsthal Aarhus, Board member of the Danish Arts foundation's committee)	Words at an Exhibition - an exhibition in ten chapters and five poems	
2022	Sep.3~Nov.6 (65 days)	Museum of Contemporary Art Busan, Pier 1 of Busan Port, Yeongdo, Choryang	Haeju Kim (Deputy director at Art Sonje Center, Researcher at National Theater Company of Korea, Assistant curator at Nam June Paik Art Center)	We, on the Rising Wave	
2024	Aug.17~Oct.20 (65 days)	Busan Museum of Contemporary Art, Busan Modern & Contemporary History Museum, HANSUNG1918, Choryang House	Vera Mey & Philippe Pirotte	Seeing in the Dark	
2026	Aug.29~Nov.1 (65 days)	Busan Museum of Contemporary Art, Space OneZ, Former Busan Nam High School	Evelyn Simons & Amal Khalaf	Dissident Chorus	
