= HangarBicocca =

Pirelli HangarBicocca
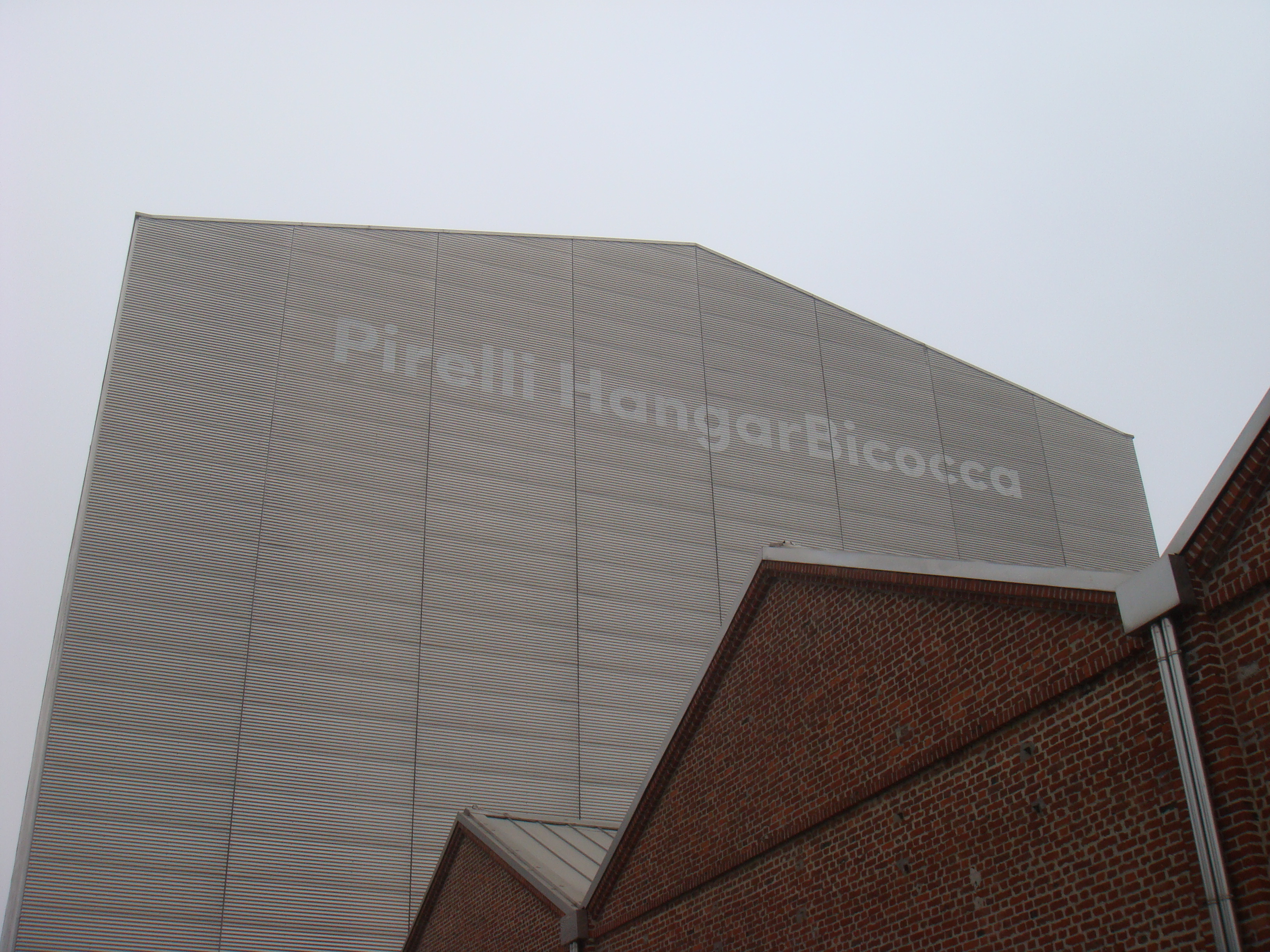
- Established: 2004
- Location: Via Chiese, 2, 20126 Milan, Italy
- Coordinates: 45°31′N 9°13′E
- Type: Art museum
- Director: Vicente Todolí
- Curator: Roberta Tenconi
- Website: pirellihangarbicocca.org

Pirelli Hangar Bicocca is a site for contemporary art exhibitions, located in the Bicocca district of Milan, Italy. The building used to be a Pirelli factory. It was converted into 10,900 square metres of exhibition galleries in 2012.

Since its inception, Pirelli HangarBicocca has hosted exhibitions of artists such as Marina Abramović, Carsten Höller, Alfredo Jaar, Joan Jonas, Mike Kelley, Matt Mullican, Philippe Parreno, Laure Prouvost, Apichatpong Weerasethakul, Maurizio Cattelan, and Lucio Fontana. It is also the site of a permanent installation by Anselm Kiefer.

== History ==
HangarBicocca, set up in 2004, officially became a foundation in 2008 after a process of restoration of the former factory premises. Its external appearance recalls what was once its main function, i.e. the headquarters of one of the most important companies in Lombardy's engineering sector: the Ansaldo Group, founded in 1886 by engineer Ernesto Breda from Padua, who contributed to the development of the railway network in Northern Italy through the production of railway carriages, steam and electric locomotives.

== Architecture ==
On the outside, the building has retained the industrial character of the company to which it belonged. The original rough concrete floors and high ceilings typical of the industrial style of the time have been preserved: in the room containing Anselm Kiefer's permanent installation The Seven Heavenly Palaces, traces of the rails used to test locomotives are still visible. This enormous exhibition space covering almost 15,000 square metres is divided into three main areas: the Cube, the Shed and the Navate.

In order of access to the exhibition spaces, the three main covers are described below.

=== The Shed ===
While maintaining the original inductive character of the typical industrial building of the 1920s, made of exposed brick, low height, with double-pitched roofs and large skylights, components for locomotives and agricultural machinery were produced here.

=== The Navate ===
This is the biggest area of the foundation and it is 30-meter-high building that permanently accommodates the sculptural installation The Seven Heavenly Palaces by Anselm Kiefer.

=== The Cube ===
The cube is a barrel-vaulted cubic body characterised by the fact that, as opposed to the other exhibition spaces in the complex, it enjoys natural lighting as it was used to test electric turbines.

== Installations ==
=== Permanent installations ===
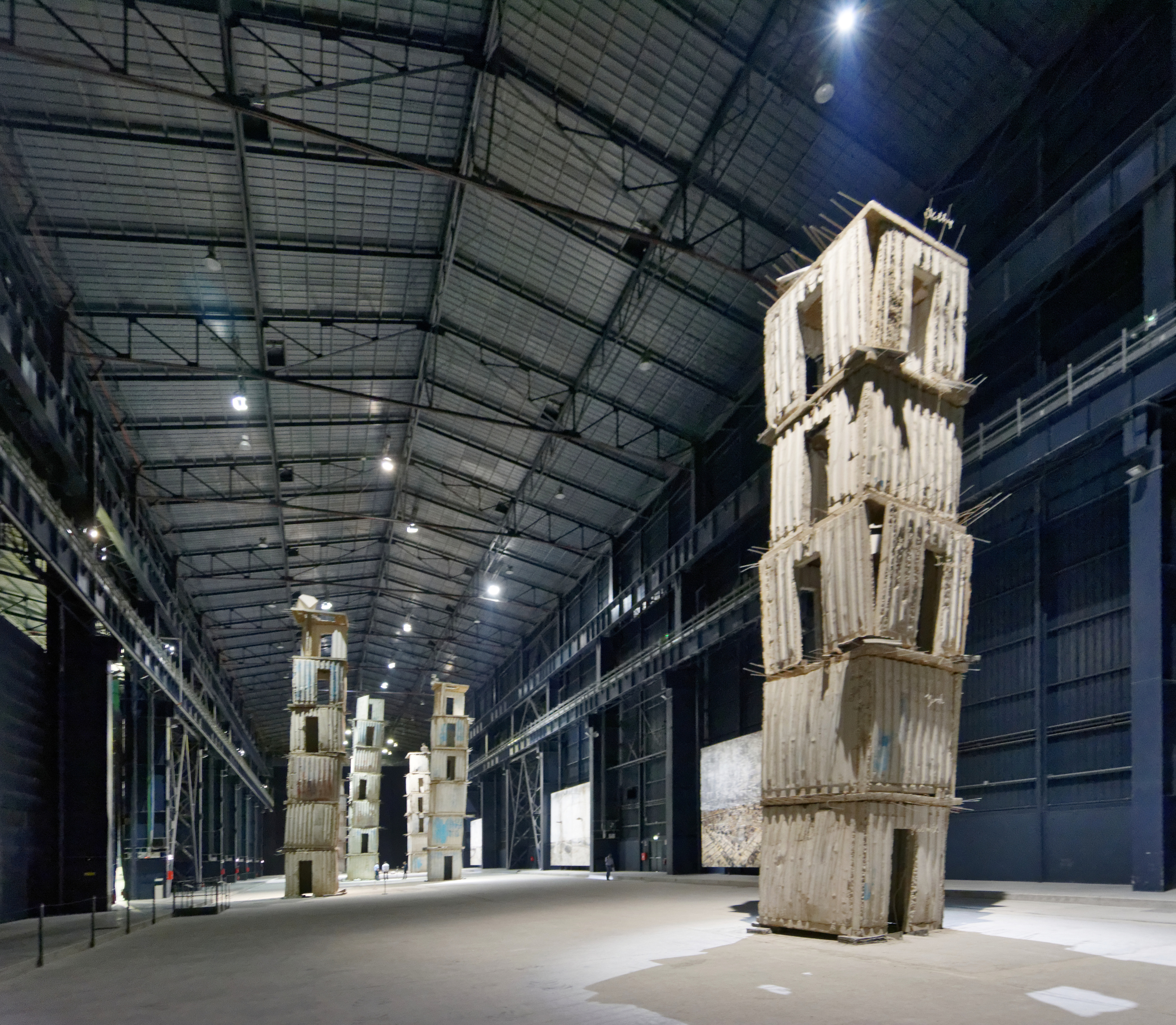
The Seven Heavenly Palaces - Anselm Kiefer

- Anselm Kiefer, The Seven Heavenly Palaces, 2004
- Fausto Melotti, La Sequenza, 1981

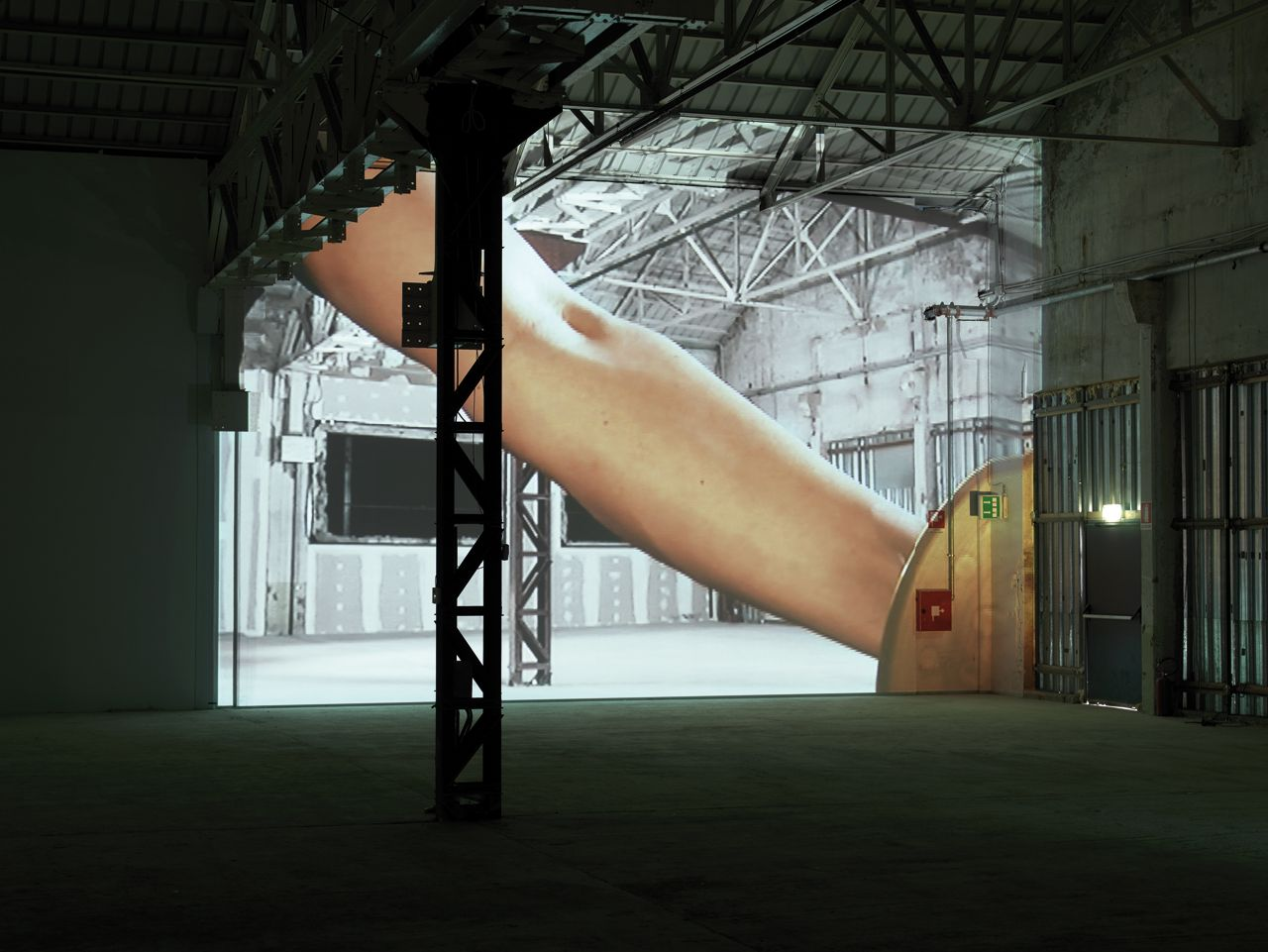
Fatica N16 - Daniele Puppi

=== Temporary installations ===
- OSGEMEOS, Efêmero, current
- Trisha Baga, the eye, the eye and the ear, current
- Chen Zhen, short-circuits, current
- Cerith Wyn Evans, “....the Illuminating Gas”, 2020
- Daniel Steegmann Mangrané, A Leaf-Shaped Animal Draws The Hand, 2020
- Sheela Gowda, Remains, 2019
- Giorgio Andreotta Calò, CittàdiMilano, 2019
- Mario Merz, Igloos, 2019
- Leonor Antunes, The last days in Galliate, 2019
- Matt Mullican, The Feeling of Things, 2018
- Eva Kot’átková, The Dream Machine is Asleep, 2018
- Vari artisti, Take me (I'm Yours), 2018
- Lucio Fontana, Environments, 2018
- Rosa Barba, From Source to Poem to Rhythm to Reader, 2017
- Miroslaw Balka, Crossover/s, 2017
- Laure Prouvost, GDM – Grand Dad’s Visitor Center, 2017
- Kishio Suga, Situations, 2017
- Carsten Höller, Doubt, 2016
- Several artists, Architecture as Art, 2016 (on the occasion of the XXI Triennale Esposizione Internazionale Milano 2016)
- Petrit Halilaj, Space Shuttle in the Garden, 2016
- Philippe Parreno, Hypothesis, 2016
- Damian Ortega, Casino, 2015
- Juan Muñoz, Double Bind & Around, 2015
- Céline Condorelli, Bau Bau, 2015
- Joan Jonas, Light Time Tales, 2015
- João Maria Gusmão & Pedro Paiva, Papagaio, 2014
- Cildo Meireles, Cildo Meireles. Installations, 2014
- Micol Assaël, ILIOKATAKINIOMUMASTILOPSARODIMAKOPIOTITA, 2014
- Dieter Roth Björn Roth, Islands, 2014
- Ragnar Kjartansson, The Visitors, 2014
- Mike Kelley, Eternity is a Long Time, 2013
- Apichatpong Weerasethakul, Primitive, 2013
- Tomás Saraceno, On Space Time Foam, 2013
- Carsten Nicolai, Unidisplay, 2013
- Emilia and Illja Kabakov, The Happiest Man, 2012
- Wilfredo Prieto, Equilibrando la curva, 2012
- Hans-Peter Feldmann, Shadow Play, 2012
- Yervant Gianikian and Angela Ricci Lucchi, NON NON NON, 2012
- Céleste Boursier-Mougenot, From here to ear, 2011
- Surasi Kusolwong, Ping—Pong, Panda, Povera, Pop—Punk, Planet, Politics and P—Art, 2011
- Several artists, Terre vulnerabili 4/4, 2011
- Several artists, Terre vulnerabili 3/4, 2011
- Several artists, Terre vulnerabili 2/4, 2011
- Several artists, Terre vulnerabili 1/4, 2011
- Phill Niblock, The movement of people working, 2010
- Christian Boltanski, Personnes, 2010
- Carlos Casas, End, 2010
- Several artists, Fuori Centro, 2010
- Anthony McCall, Breath: the vertical works, 2009
- Alfredo Jaar, It is difficult, 2009
- BLU, the graffiti on the Hangar walls, 2008
- Lucy and Jorge Orta, Antarctica, 2008
- Daniele Puppi, Fatica n.16, 2008
- Contemporary artists from India, Urban Manners, 2008
- Emergenze project's several artists, Not afraid of the dark, 2007
- Several artists, Collateral, 2007
- Several artists in collaboration with START Association, Start@Hangar, 2007
- Marina Abramović, Balkan Epic, 2006
- Adelina von Fürstenberg, Playground & Toys, 2005
- Mark Wallinger, Easter, 2005

== See also ==
- List of largest art museums
