= Ute Meta Bauer =

German curator

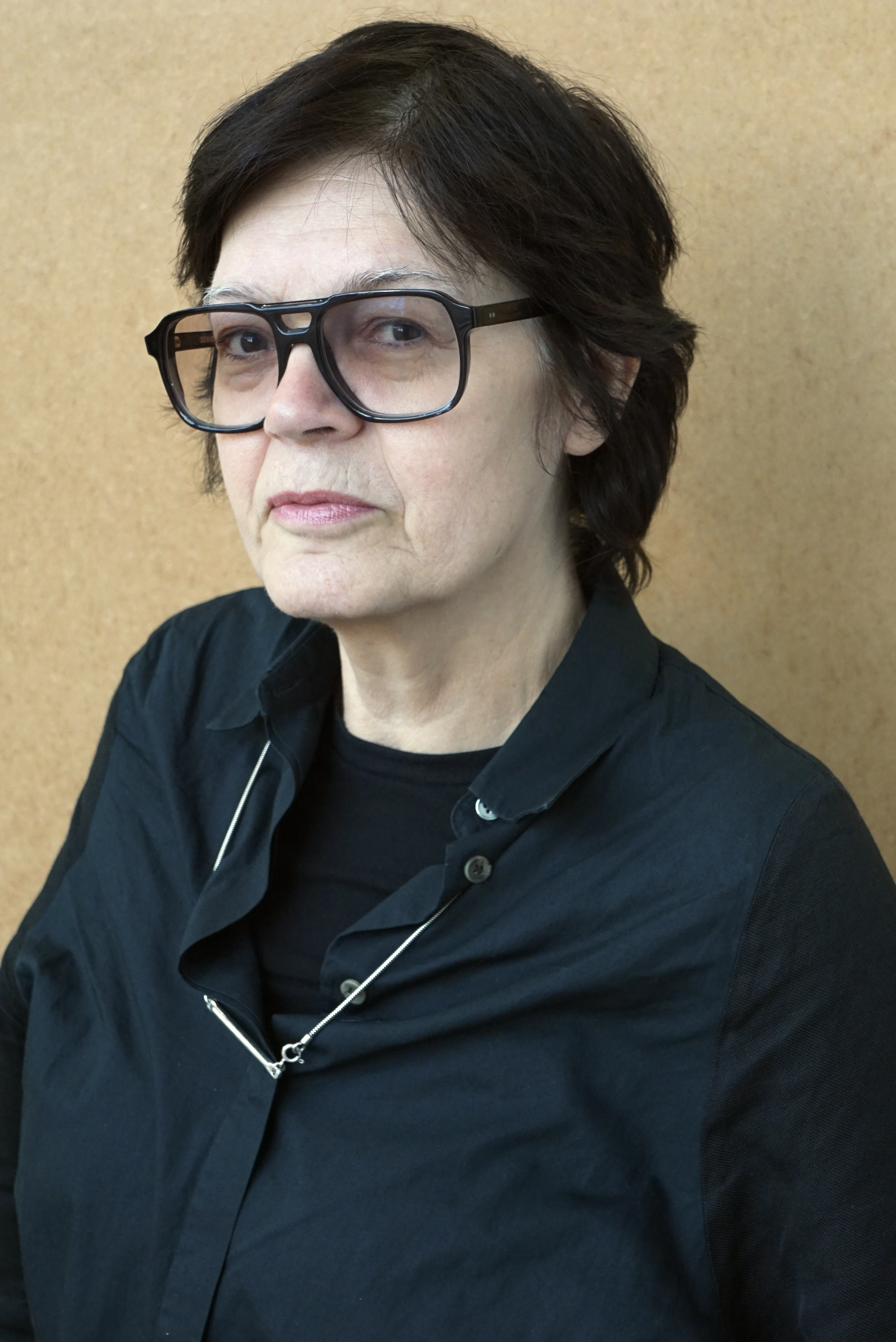
- Ute Meta Bauer in 2025
- Born: 1958 (age 67–68); Stuttgart, Germany
- Occupation: Curator

Ute Meta Bauer (born 1958) is a German curator based in Singapore. She is an international curator, professor of contemporary art and was the founding director of the Centre for Contemporary Art (CCA) in Singapore.

== Early life and education ==
Bauer was born in 1958 and grew up in Stuttgart, Germany. She studied at the Hochschule der Bildenden Künste, Hamburg, Germany, and graduated in 1987 with a Diploma with Honours in Visual Communication/Stage Design.

== Career ==
From 1990 to 1994, Bauer was Artistic Director of the Künstlerhaus Stuttgart, where she programmed several exhibitions and conferences on contemporary art, such as Radical Chic (1993) and A New Spirit in Curating (1992). From 1996 to 2006, Bauer held an appointment at the Academy of Fine Arts Vienna in Austria, as a professor of theory and practice of contemporary art.

Bauer served as the Founding Director of the Office for Contemporary Art in Norway from 2002 to 2005. Afterwards, she moved onto Massachusetts Institute of Technology (MIT), where she was Associate Professor for Visual Arts until 2012. She was also the founding director of its Art, Culture, and Technology (ACT) programme.

From 2012 to 2013, Bauer was Dean of Fine Art at the Royal College of Art in London.

Ute Meta Bauer was the founding director of the Centre for Contemporary Art (CCA) in Singapore and has served as Professor of Art at Nanyang Technological University (NTU)'s School of Art, Media and Design since 2013. She stepped down as director of the CCA in July 2024, being replaced in the role by Karin G. Oen, but continues to act as Principal Investigator there and teaches in the museum studies and curatorial practices programme.

== Exhibitions ==
Bauer has curated many exhibitions on contemporary art with a focus on transdisciplinary media. In 2012 she curated The Future Archive at the Neuer Berliner Kunstverein (n.b.k.), in Berlin, Germany. This show focused on artistic research projects of the 1970s and 1980s related to the Center for Advanced Visual Studies (CAVS), which was founded in 1967 by György Kepes at MIT. In 2005, Bauer curated the Mobile_Transborder Archive for InSite05, in Tijuana /San Diego, which consisted of a mobile unit created to connect various institutions, entities and individuals around issues related to the San Diego-Tijuana and the California-Baja California border region.

In 2004, Bauer was the Artistic Director of the 3rd Berlin Biennale for Contemporary Art, which presented 50 contemporary artists at KW Institute for Contemporary Art and at the Martin-Gropius-Bau. The Biennale focused on 5 topics Migration, Urban Conditions, Sonic Scapes, Sashions and Scenes, and Other Cinemas. Exhibited artists included: Fernando Bryce, Banu Cennetoğlu, Florian Hecker, Melik Ohanian, Ulrike Ottinger, Mathias Poledna, Aura Rosenberg, Bojan Sarčević, Dierk Schmidt, Nomeda & Gediminas Urbonas, and Amelie von Wulffen. She was the curator of the Nordic Pavilion (Norway, Sweden) for the 50th edition of the Venice Biennale in 2003. Curator of the exhibition First Story – Women Building/New Narratives for the 21st Century at the Palace Gallery, in 2001, for Porto European Cultural Capital, and Architectures of Discourse for the Fundació Antoni Tapiès in Barcelona, Spain, in the same year. In 2021 Bauer co-curated the National Pavilion of Singapore at the 59th Venice Art Biennale with Shubigi Rao. Bauer served as a curator for the 17th Istanbul Biennial in 2022.

Her co-curatorial projects include the exhibition Paradise Lost with Anca Rujoiu which inaugurated the Centre for Contemporary Art (CCA) in 2014, the World Biennial Forum No. 1, Gwangju, South Korea with Hou Hanru in 2012, and the Documenta 11 (2001–2002), Kassel, Germany, along with Okwui Enwezor team. Bauer also co-curated the show Now Here at the Louisiana Museum of Modern Art in 1996, Humlebæk, Denmark, along with Laura Cottingham, Anneli Fuchs & Lars Grambye, Iwona Blazwick, among others.

In 2024 Bauer was the artistic director of the Diriyah Contemporary Art Biennale 2024.

== Publications ==
- 1992-94 META 1-4 (Stuttgart)
- 2001 Education, Information, Entertainment. New Approaches in Higher Artistic Education (Vienna: Selene; Institut für Gegenwartskunst)
- 2001-02 case (Barcelona, 2001; Porto, 2002)
- 2003-06 Verksted # 1-6 (Oslo)
- 2007 A Dynamic Equilibrium: In pursuit of public terrain (co-authored with Magali Arriola, Judith Barry, Teddy Cruz among others, México City)
- 2009 What’s left…What remains? (Simposio Internacional de Teoría de Arte Contemporáneo, Patronage for Contemporary Art in Mexico City)
- 2011 Stephen Willats: Art Society Feedback (with Anja Casser)
- 2012 Intellectual Birdhouse, Artistic Practice as Research (co-edited with Florian Dombois, Michael Schwab and Claudia Mareis, Walther König, Köln)
- 2013 World Biennale Forum No 1 – Shifting Gravity (co-edited with Hou Hanru, Hatje Cantz)
- 2013 Magne Furuholmen: In Transit (co-authored with Selene Wendt, Forlaget Press)
- 2014 AR – Artistic Research (co-edited with Thomas D. Trummer, Walther König, Köln)
- 2018 Place.Labour.Capital. (edited with Anca Rujoiu, NTU Centre for Contemporary Art Singapore)
