= List of people from Shanghai =

This is a list of notable people who were born or raised in Shanghai, China, or have spent a large or formative part of their life in that city.

== Native Shanghainese ==
=== A ===
- Angelababy (born 1989) – actress

=== B ===
- Bao Jianfeng (born 1975) – actor and singer

=== C ===
- Eileen Chang (1920–1995) – writer
- Chin Tsi-ang (1909–2007) – Hong Kong actress
- Tycho Collins (born 2001) – football player

=== D ===
- Dai Xiangyu (born 1984) – actor and model
- Ding Yuxi (born 1995) – actor

=== F ===
- Sam Feldman (born 1949) – Canadian music executive
- Jerry Fujio (1940–2021) – Japanese singer, actor and tarento
- Feng Shaofeng (born 1978) – actor

=== G ===
- Seven Gao, singer
- Ben Gu (born 1961) – librarian, translator and library science researcher
- Guo Liang (born 1968) – Singaporean actor and television presenter

=== H ===
- Fan Ho (1931–2016) – photographer, film director and actor
- Huang Yu (1916–2013) – actor and filmmaker
- Hu Ge (born 1982) – actor

=== J ===
- Jing Chao (born 1986) – actor
- Edward Judd (1932–2009) – British actor
- Ju Wenjun (born 1991) – chess grandmaster and Women's World Champion from 2018–present.

=== K ===
- Ku Feng (1930–2025) – Hong Kong actor
- Burt Kwouk (1930–2016) – British actor

=== L ===
- Lai Hang (1928–1965) – actor
- Lydia Li – TV presenter and actress
- Lu Jinhua (1927–2018) – Yue opera artist
- Lu Yuxiao (born 1999) - actress

=== M ===
- Ma Yili (born 1976) – actress
- Mei Baojiu (1934–2016) – Peking opera artist and politician
- Ma Zhencheng (born 1934) – translator

=== O ===
- Henry O (born 1927) – actor

=== Q ===
- Qian Zhijun (born 1987) – actor
- Qiao Renliang (1987–2016) – singer and actor

=== S ===
- Josephine Siao (born 1947) – Hong Kong actress
- Sze Yu (born 1962) – Australian actor and former badminton player

=== T ===
- Kaiji Tang (born 1984) – voice actor
- Tiffany Tang (born 1983) – actress
- Kenneth Tsang (1935–2022) – Hong Kong actor

=== W ===
- Wei Zongwan (born 1938) – actor
- Wu Pang (1909–2000) – Hong Kong filmmaker

=== X ===
- Xu Zheng (born 1972) – actor and filmmaker
- Joker Xue (born 1983) – singer-songwriter

=== Y ===
- Yan Shunkai (1937–2017) – actor and comedian
- Yueh Hua (1942–2018) – Hong Kong actor
- Yan Mingyong (born 1985) – gymnast
- Yang Yang (born 1991) – actor
- Yang Rong (仰融, born 1957) – businessman
- Yitang Zhang (born 1955) – mathematician

=== Z ===
- Zheng Junli (1911–1969) – actor and filmmaker
- Zhu Guanghu (born 1949) – football coach, actor and former footballer
- Zhong Chenle (born 2001) – singer; member of K-Pop group NCT
- Zhou Guanyu (born 1999) – Formula One driver

== Non-native Shanghainese ==
These people were not born or adopted in Shanghai and raised elsewhere but are well known for living in Shanghai.

=== B ===
- Ba Jin (1904–2005) – writer; born and raised in Chengdu, Sichuan

=== L ===
- Lu Xun (1881–1936) – writer, literary critic, and educator; born and raised in Shaoxing, Zhejiang

=== S ===
- Su Qing (1914–1982) – writer; born and raised in Ningbo, Zhejiang

=== Z ===
- Zhang Chunqiao (1917–2005) – politician and writer; born and raised in Juye County, Shandong
