= Chen Qi =

Chen Qi may refer to:

- Chen Qi (artist) (born 1956), Chinese/Singaporean oil painting and ink painting artist
- Chen Qi (collector) (1912–2000), Chinese collector of art and antiquities
- Chen Qi (Investiture of the Gods), character in Investiture of the Gods, one of Heng Ha Er Jiang
- Chen Qi (javelin thrower) (born 1982), Chinese javelin thrower
- Chen Qi (table tennis) (born 1983), Chinese table tennis player
- Chen Qi (official) (born 1878), Chinese official and exhibition organizer.
