= Chen Yu =

Chen Yu may refer to:

- Chen Yu (Eighteen Kingdoms) (陈馀; died 202 BC), Chinese politician and general
- Chen Yu (politician) (陈郁; 1901–1974), Chinese politician, Governor of Guangdong, 1957–1967
- Chen Yu (information scientist) (陈禹; born 1944), Chinese information scientist and information economist
- Chen Yu (badminton) (陈郁; born 1980), Chinese badminton player
- Chen Yu (synchronised swimmer) (陈瑜; born 1981), Chinese synchronised swimmer
- Chen Yu (actress) (陳妤; born 1994), Taiwanese actress
- Pen name (陳瑜) of Tian Han (1898–1968), Chinese playwright
- Yu Chen (artist) (余陈), Chinese contemporary artist and professor at the Central Academy of Fine Arts in Beijing
