= Luo Li Rong =

Chinese artist and sculptor (born 1980)

- 罗丽蓉
- Born: 1980 (age 45–46)
- Education: Academy of Fine Arts of Beijing
- Occupation: Artist
- Known for: Sculptures of women in bronze

Luo Lirong (simplified Chinese: 罗丽蓉; traditional Chinese: 羅麗蓉; pinyin: Luó Lìróng) is a Chinese artist and sculptor. She creates realistic sculptures, primarily in bronze.

== Biography ==
Luo was born in 1980 in Hongqi, Hunan province, China.

In 1998, Luo entered the Changsha Academy of Arts in Changsha, Hunan and studied with Xiao Xiaoqiu. From 2000 to 2005 she studied sculpture at the CAFA (Central Academy of Fine Arts in Beijing, China) with Sun Jiabo. In 2005, she graduated with honors. While at the CAFA, Luo participated in multiple public sculpting projects including a sculpture installed in 2003 in Dalian Park for the 2008 Olympic Games in Beijing.

In 2005 Luo traveled to France and in 2006, she and her husband moved to Belgium, where they lived until 2017. In 2018, Luo opened the Luo Lirong Foundry in Bologna, Italy.

== Works ==
2016

- Bonheur simple, 5.9 x 7.5 x 5.5 inch, bronze sculpture
- L'Arrivée du jour, 43.3 x 20.9 x 18.9 inch, bronze sculpture
- Ligne de ton dos, 6.3 x 13.4 x 5.1 inch, bronze sculpture
- Je me souviens de toi, 11.8 x 10.2 x 4.7 inch, bronze sculpture

2017

- L'Arrivée du jour (sans feuille), 43.3 x 20.9 x 18.9 inch, bronze sculpture
- La mélodie oubliée, 205 x 85 x 85 cm, bronze sculpture

2018

- Vol Haut, 35 x 20.9 x 16.9 inch, bronze sculpture
