= Shuo =

Shuo is a transliteration of multiple Chinese given names. Notable people with these names include:

- Cao Shuo (born 1991), Chinese track and field athlete
- Fang Shuo (born 1990), Chinese basketball player
- Jiang Shuo (born 1958), Chinese skulptor
- Wang Shuo (born 1958), Chinese author, director and actor
