= Yu Xingze =

Chinese contemporary visual artist

- Chinese: 于幸泽
- Born: 1973 (age 52–53); Xiuyan, Liaoning Province, China
- Education: Lu Xun Fine Art Academy, Shenyang, China Düsseldorf Academy of Fine Art, Düsseldorf, Germany Kassel Academy of Fine Art, Kassel, Germany Central Academy of Fine Arts, Beijing, China
- Known for: Painter, Professor

Yu Xingze (Chinese: 于幸泽, Xiuyan, Liaoning Province, born 1976) is a Chinese contemporary visual artist living between Bochum, Beijing and Shanghai.

== Life ==
Yu was born in the Liaoning Province, in northern China, in 1976. From 1996 to 2000 he completed his bachelor's degree at the Lu Xun Fine Arts Academy, in Shenyang, around 250 km north of his hometown Xiuyan. In 2001, at the age of 25, he moved to Europe to study at the Düsseldorf Academy of Fine Art under the German artist Jörg Immendorff. Fearing that the influence of the strong willed master would have suppressed his individual style and seeking for academic experience in more than only one establishment, he enrolled at the Academy of Fine Art in Kassel in 2002. In 2006, he earned his master's degree in painting at the Kunsthochschule Kassel, Germany, under Professor Jurgen Meyer. In 2013 he had his PhD from the School of Architecture of the Central Academy of Fine Arts, Beijing, China. He is now an associate professor at School of Architecture and Urban Planning of the Tongji University in Shanghai and works between there, Beijing and Bochum.

== Artistic work ==
When studying abroad in Germany, Yu has found a transparent chemical fabric, solid and with closely, woven meshes, which could be seen through from front to back. This kid of fabric, after slightly processing, can be a painting medium. Its transparency implicates the creation of a hybrid dimension that consists of both the virtual space created through the artist's brush strokes and the physical space in front and behind the canvas. The painted net between the subject and the observer, the incisiveness of the chiaroscuro and the round thicker layers of colour tidily painted by the artist at regular distance collaborate to intensify this effect. The "spatialisation" and "sensitisation" of painting have already become a new trend of this era, and this group of transparent paintings by Yu just corresponds to this new indication, being of great inspiration for the development of painting methods.

== Solo exhibitions ==
His selected solo exhibitions include:

- X City, Shanghai Urban Planning Exhibition Centre, China, 2017
- Yu Xingze 2013-2015 Painting Exhibition, Chun Art Museum in Shanghai, China, 2016
- Animal Brain, Schiller Gallery in Heidelberg, Germany, 2015
- The self is not a reference, Chun Art Museum Shanghai, China, 2015
- Visual Paradise – Three Worlds About Yu Xingze, Sishang Art Museum in Beijing, China, 2014
- All Promising Phenomena, Meta Gallery, Shanghai, China, 2014
- The Transparent of Reflection, Modern Art Space, Shanghai Himalaya Museum, Shanghai, China, 2013
- Free Toys, Huayi Gallery, Guangzhou, China, 2010
- Free Toys, M Art space, Shanghai, China, 2010
- Bubbles, Academy of Fine Arts, University of Kassel, Germany, 2006
- Tower, Stellerk Gallery, Kassel, Germany, 2004
- Color-Feeling, Sparkasse, Bochum, Germany, 2002

== Group exhibitions ==
His selected group exhibitions include:

- Art & Antique Vienna Hofburg, Vienna, Austria Schütz Fine Art-Chinese Department, 2018
- Fair for Art Vienna, Vienna, Austria Schütz Fine Art-Chinese Department, 2018
- Art & Antique Residenz Salzburg (March and August), Salzburg, Austria, Schütz Fine Art-Chinese Department Art & Antique, 2018
- Art & Antique Vienna Hofburg, Vienna, Austria Schütz Fine Art-Chinese Department, 2017
- Mutual Supplementary and Conformity, Chinese contemporary art invitational exhibition, Ludwig Art Museum, Koblenz, Germany, 2016
- Another Germany, Duisburg Art Hall, Duisburg, Germany, 2016
- Portrait Now! National Museum of Denmark, Copenhagen, Denmark, 2015
- New Family, Chun Museum Shanghai, China, 2015
- Remember, Shuangcheng, Art Exhibit, Duolun Museum, Shanghai, China, 2015
- Five Chinese Artists, Bremen city Hall, Bremen, Germany, 2014
- Portrait Time Art Museum, Beijing, China, 2014
- Naive - Opening Exhibition, Eleven Art Museum, Shanghai, China, 2014
- Thawing and Sink, Opening Exhibition, Museum of New Art, Hangzhou, China, 2014
- Images Pingshan - Exhibition of famous works of Chinese and foreign sculpture, Shenzhen, China, 2014
- Seoul Guanghua Gate International Art Festival, Sejong cultural center, Seoul, South Korea, 2014
- Yuan Shitao: a case study of non sociology, modern Art Space of Zendai Himalaya Art Museum, Shanghai, China 2014
- TALK ON THE HORSE, XI Gallery, Shanghai, China, 2014
- Perpetual Motion, Contemporary Art Invitational Exhibition, Global port Art Museum, Shanghai, China, 2014
- Seoul World Open Art Exhibition, Sejong Cultural Center, Seoul, South Korea, 2014
- The Media & Method in the Contemporary Painting, Sishang Art Museum, Beijing, China, 2013
- China Youth Art Exhibition, SAP Exhibition Centre, Heidelberg, Germany, 2012
- Pulse of Asia, China contemporary art exhibition, Bangkok Contemporary Art Museum, Bangkok, Thailand, 2011
- Super Organism – The 1st CAFAM Biennale, Beijing, China, 2011
- Time and Space Survey, 21 Art Center, Shanghai, China, 2010
- The Opening Exhibition of Shangshagn Museum, ShangShang Museum, Beijing, China, 2009
- Leaving the Spotlights, New York Contemporary Art Center, New York, United States, 2008
- The New Art from China - First Art Fair of Washington, Chinese Art Section, International Conference Center, Washington, D.C., United States, 2007
- EXAMEN 06, Kassel Train Station Right Wing, Kassel, Germany, 2006
- NORD ART 2006 - the 10th International Art Exhibition, Büdelsdorf, Germany, 2006
- Dongbei 20 Years Art Exhibition, Guangdong Museum, Guangzhou, China, 2006
- NORD ART 2005 - Mysterious Art - the 9th International Art Exhibition, Büdelsdorf, Germany, 2005
- NORD ART 2004 - Unlimited - the 8th International Art Exhibition, Büdelsdorf, Germany, 2004
- Six Young Artists from Kassel, Aachen Museum, Aachen, Germany, 2004

== Selected works ==
- Dalai Lama, oil on transparent canvas, 130 x 90 cm, 2013, Schütz Fine Art - Chinese Department
- Golden Gun, oil on transparent canvas, 60 x 90 cm, 2013, Schütz Fine Art - Chinese Department
- Hi Flower-Irises, oil on transparent canvas, radius: 50 cm, 2013, Schütz Fine Art - Chinese Department
- Hi Flower-Poppy, oil on transparent canvas, radius: 50 cm, 2013
- Hi Flower-Rosa Chinensis, oil on transparent canvas, radius: 50 cm, 2013
- The Gorilla Looking Far Into The Distance 5, oil on transparent canvas, 100 x 70 cm, 2013
- The Gorilla Looking Far Into The Distance 2, oil on transparent canvas, 100 x 70 cm 2013
- The Gorilla Looking Far Into The Distance 4, oil on transparent canvas, 100 x 70 cm, 2013

== Bibliography ==
- Building Bridges, Masterworks of Contemporary Chinese Art, Schütz Fine Art Chinese Department, 2015.
- All Promising Phenomena, Xingze Yu Solo Exhibition, meta gallery, 2014.
- Yu Xingze’s Works, catalogue exhibition The Transparency of Reflection, 2014.
- Free to Xingze plaything: Works Guangdong people's Fine Arts Publishing House
- In Xingze works, Jiangxi Fine Arts Publishing House, 2014 ISBN 978-7-5480-2975-5
- Visual art Xingze Park - in the world, Intellectual Property Press, 2014 (edited by Wang Meng)
- In Xingze: 2013-2015 painting works, Liaoning Fine Arts Publishing House, ISBN 978-7-5314-7295-7

== See also ==
- Central Academy of Fine Arts
- Tongji Universität
- Lu Xun Academy of Fine Arts
- Jörg Immendorff
