= Yan Ping (artist) =

Chinese painter

- Born: 1956 (age 69–70); Jinan, Shandong, China
- Education: Central Academy of Fine Arts (CAFA)
- Alma mater: Shandong University of Arts
- Website: https://yanping.artron.net/

Yan Ping (Chinese: 闫平; born in 1956 in Jinan, Shandong, China) is a female oil painter in China. Yan Ping attended to Shandong University of Arts in 1979, graduated in 1983 and then stayed in Shandong University of Arts. In 1989, Yan Ping attended to the oil painting seminar class of Central Academy of Fine Arts (CAFA). She is now a professor of School of Arts, Renmin University of China, director of China Artists Association, director of China Oil Painting Society. Her work combines a sensibility of vitality with rationality, connecting art to life in the context of a female's individual perspective.

== Artistic style ==
Yan Ping's painting style emphasizes color expression. The clear indoor light and bright colors drawn by her distinctive character strokes introduce something new to Chinese audiences, who are accustomed to heavy forms, and repressed emotions of art to feel the cheerful and clarity of humanity from art. Yan Ping's paintings give a warm and clear humanity to the stressful Chinese environment. The most frequent colors found in Yan Ping's oil paintings are rose pink and gemstone green. She uses them because they represent life, a reference to heme and chlorophyll as the source of life for animals and plants. The red and green colors symbolize a vitality of an endless force and emotion. Yan Ping has hopeful beliefs that for peace and compassion, but she encountered a devastating decade of the Cultural Revolution during her childhood. Thus, her value in beauty and romance were not with her at the time. As a result, Yan Ping brought these feelings and thoughts about love alive in her artwork. Yan Ping's works today are vivid, lively and romantic, which are dramatically opposite from her adolescent experiences.

== Select works ==
Select works: From 1990 to 2016, Yan Ping had created a total of 208 oil paintings, the most famous of which is her Mother and Son series. She had held solo exhibitions in Beijing, Jinan and Hong Kong. She has published nine individual painting albums.

Year	Title of the Artwork (Title in Chinese)	Scale
1990-1995	Me and My Son (我和儿子) Rose·Rose (玫瑰·玫瑰) Let’s Dance Again #1(让我们再舞之一)	150*150 cm 55*60 cm 160*140 cm
1996-2000	Mother and Son (母与子) Mother (母亲) Warm Wind has Blown (暖风吹过) Swan Lake#2 (天鹅湖之二) Little Drama Troupe (小戏班子)	160*140 cm 160*140 cm 140*120 cm 140*160 cm 140*160 cm
2001-2005	Warm Air(温暖的空气) Mother and Son-Large Pink Lily (母与子-大粉百合) Peony Blossom (芍药花开) Purple(紫色) Flying Like Birds (像鸟儿一样飞)	59*60 cm 160*140 cm 160*140 cm 140*240 cm 140*160 cm
2006-2010	Mother and Son (母与子) You Are My Pan Anmao (你是我的潘安貌) Listen to the Wind (Left) (听风（左）) Listen to the Wind (Right) (听风（右）) Mother and Son 1 (母与子1)	140*160 cm 180*200 cm 200*180 cm 200*181 cm 130*160 cm
2011-2016	Mother and Son 3 (母与子3) Soft Heart (柔软的心) Attraction (吸引) Flying Birds in Heart #3 (心有飞鸟（三）) Red Flowers and Young Boy(红花与少年)	140*160 cm 140*240 cm 200*180 cm*2 180*160 cm 140*120 cm

== Exhibitions ==
=== Select solo exhibitions ===
Date	Location	Title of Exhibition (Title in Chinese)
June 20, 2016 - June 28, 2016	Rongbaozhai Painting Museum (Beijing, China)	“flying bird in heart” Yan Ping Solo Oil Painting Exhibition （“心有飞鸟”闫平油画展）
November 24, 2016 - November 30, 2016	Rongbaozhai Painting Museum Hongkong (Hongkong)	Song of the Fisherman（渔光曲）
October 28, 2017 -November 8, 2017	Yan Ping Art Studio at Banyue Bay Art Park (Weihai, Shandong, China)	Ocean is Blue (海水正蓝)

== Publications ==
Publications:

Date of publication	Title of publication (title in Chinese)	Publishing company
October 1996	Comments of Chinese Modern Artworks··Yan Ping (中国当代艺术品评·闫平)	GUANGXI ARTS PUBLISHING HOUSE Co. Ltd 广西美术出版社
December 2001	Touch of Love (闫平之《真情》作品集)	-
January 2002	Famous Artists and Artworks Selection—Yan Ping (名家名品系列丛书—闫平)	ZHEJIANG PEOPLE’S FINE ARTS PUBLISHING HOUSE 浙江人民美术出版社
January 2006	Waiting for Flowers Blossoms—Yan Ping 2006 (等你花开—闫平2006)	People’ Fine Arts Publishing House人民美术出版社
-	I Like the Fragrance of Lil—Huang Beijia VS Yan Ping (我喜欢百合的香味—黄蓓佳VS 闫平)	ZHEJIANG PEOPLE’S FINE ARTS PUBLISHING HOUSE 浙江人民美术出版社
July 2006	Color Impression and Language (色彩印象语言)	Shanghai Painting and Book Publishing House上海书画出版社
-	Yan Ping (闫平)	People' Fine Arts Publishing House 人民美术出版社
January 2010	Contemporary Artist—Yan Ping (当代艺术家, 闫平)	Shandong Arts Publishing House 山东美术出版社
April 2012	Awakening Insects: Oil Painting Research of Yan Ping (惊蛰: 闫平油画艺术探究)	Shandong Arts Publishing House山东美术出版社
