= Yan Cong =

Chinese contemporary artist (born 1983)

Yan Cong (Chinese: 烟囱, born in 1983 in Hubei, China) is a Chinese contemporary artist currently living in Beijing, China.

Born in Yicheng, Hubei, after graduating from high school Yan Cong moved to Beijing to study at the Central Academy of Fine Arts in Beijing China.

Yan Cong has published multiple comics both online and in print. As well as individual pieces, Yan Cong also sells the original drawings and paintings from his books in art galleries.

He currently lives and works in Beijing with his wife.

== Background ==
Yan Cong was born in Yicheng, Hubei, China in 1983 with the birth name Peng Han (Chinese: 彭撼). He uses the pseudonym Yan Cong when signing his works and publishing his comics. The name Yan Cong comes from the Chinese for "chimney", which was inspired by Yan Cong's love and longing for the countryside.

Yan Cong moved to Beijing to study a degree in Traditional Chinese Painting at CAFA, Central Academy of Fine Arts. While studying Yan Cong began drawing comics and uploading them on the internet in his spare time. He said the online praise he received motivated him to continue with his work.

After graduating from CAFA Yan Cong went on to being printing his comics and showing his works in commercial galleries.

Yan Cong is currently represented in mainland China by Star Gallery in Beijing, and Leo Gallery in Hong Kong.

His work has been published in Europe.

== Publications ==
- Cry 《哭》(2018)
- Dick Hair 《屌毛》(2017)
- Spikelets Summer 《小穗的夏天》(2011)
- Elephant Dream 《大象的梦》(2010)
- Yan Cong 《烟囱》(2008)
- Pixel Fart 《像素屁》(2008)
- Soda Shop 《汽水小店》(2008)
- Find Yourself 《找自己》(2008)
- Naughty Kids 《坏孩子的天空》(2006)
- Next Station, Cartoon? 《下一站，卡通吗？》(2005)
