= Wu Shaoxiang =

Chinese contemporary sculptor

- 吳少湘
- Born: 1957 (age 68–69); Jiangxi Province, China
- Education: Jingdezhen Ceramics Institute Central Academy of Fine Arts
- Known for: Sculpture

Wu Shaoxiang (Chinese: 吳少湘; born 1957) is a Chinese sculptor living between Berlin, Beijing and Carinthia, Austria.

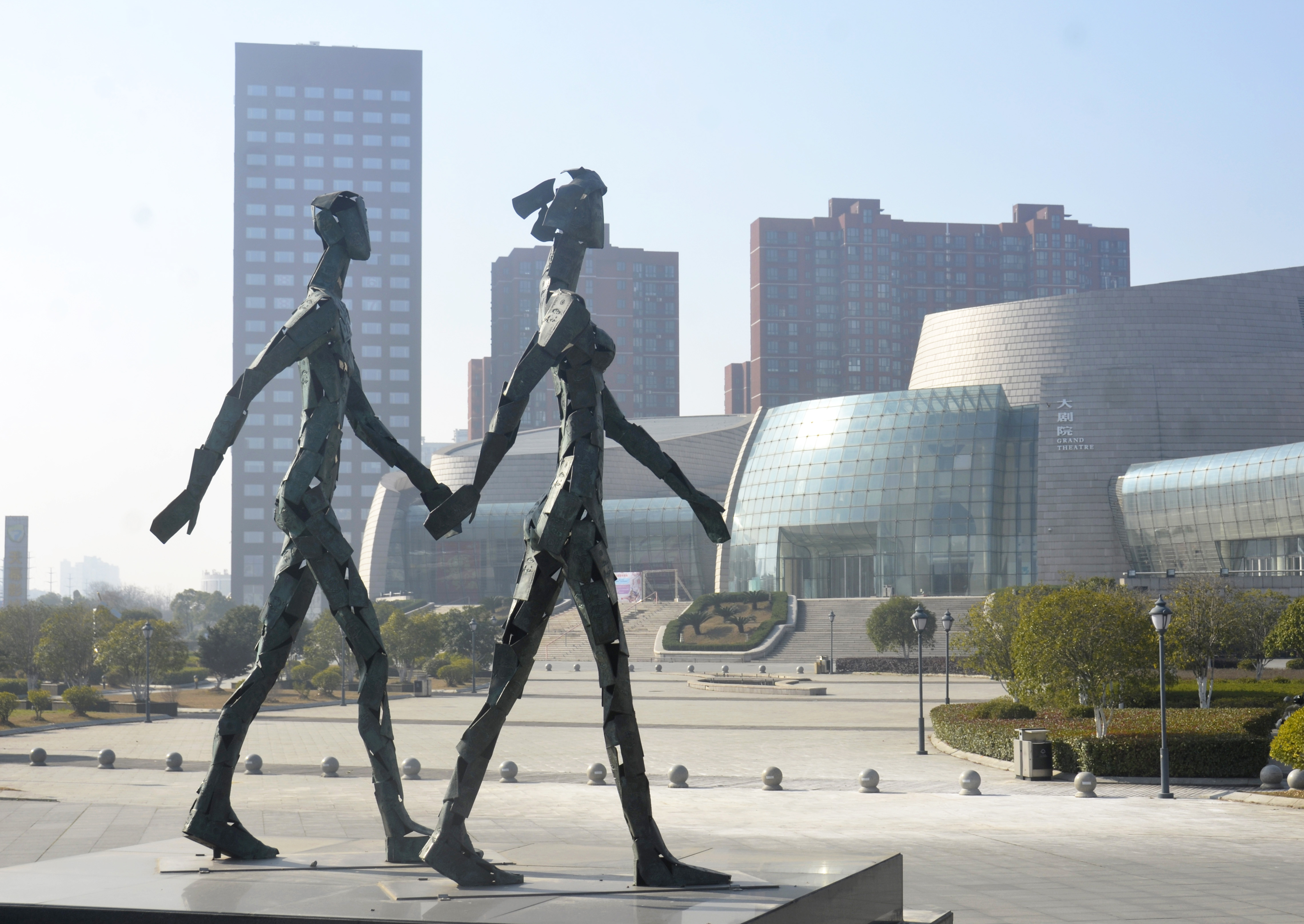
Walking Wealth, 2009, bronze, Jiang Xi Art Museum collection, Nanchang, China

== Biography ==
Wu Shaoxiang was born in 1957 in Jiangxi Province, China. Having only received ongoing formal education until he was twelve, Wu was sent to work on a farm to lay bricks and saw wood for rafters. It was only when he turned twenty-one that he could he begin his career as a sculptor.

From 1978 to 1982, Wu studied sculpture at the Jingdezhen Ceramics Institute, then left to work at the China National Design Association in Beijing for two years. From 1984 to 1987, he pursued postgraduate studies under the sculptor Professor Zheng Ke, at the Central Academy of Arts and Design, now the Central Academy of Fine Arts, Tsinghua University, Beijing, China. After graduating with a master's degree, he taught as a lecturer at the academy.

An important figure in China's New-Wave art movement, Wu won the first scholarship awarded by the city of Beijing, and was named one of the "Ten Most Influential Chinese Avant-Garde Artists" by Fine Arts of China (the most important magazine at the time for modern art published in China). The purpose behind the New-Wave group was to review traditional Chinese art through courageous experimentation in the face of the ever-increasing influence of Western culture, in order to bring Chinese art to the modern world. In 1988, the National Art Museum of China organized its first major solo exhibition, and in the same year, he was the first modern Chinese artist to be allowed to place a sculpture - "Meditation" - in a public space in Europe. On June 6, 1989, two days after the massacre on Tiananmen Square, he was able to leave China with the help of the Austrian Embassy. He settled in Austria with his wife Jiang Shuo, who is also a sculptor, and their son. In 1991, he created "Apple", his first sculpture made entirely of coins. It was included in the Guinness World Records Book 1995 and is now in the Austrian National Bank. He obtained Austrian citizenship in 1993 and published a book of his sculptures since his arrival in Europe. He exhibited at this time in Europe and Asia. After cancer treatment in 1996 he built a new studio in Carinthia with his wife Jiang Shuo and wrote the autobiographical novel "The Shadow of the Sun". In 2006, he set up a studio in Beijing, and later he published "Art of Sculpture", which became a textbook for all Chinese universities. He is a visiting professor at the Academy of Fine Arts of Fu Dan University in Shanghai since 2008. Due to its increasing popularity, 2012 saw the opening of a studio in Berlin. Alternating Wu Shaoxiang lives today in Austria, Berlin and Beijing. 2017 he became a visiting professor at Tianjin Academy of Fine Arts. His works are also widely collected by museums and prestigious institutions worldwide.

== Early works ==
The artist's work first caught the attention of the public through several modern abstract sculptures, which were commissioned for several locations, including a Beijing park, the Theatre of the Chinese Association of the Arts, and the Central Academy of Science. In his early stage as a sculptor, Wu was influenced by Western modernism. His "Outcry Series" created during the mid-1980s resembled the stylistic representation of sculptors such as Arp and Brâncuși, as well as Duchampe's his ironic sculptures and the artistic method of Chinese impressionism. This series was noted at the time for their abstract presentation of the female body, and representation of sexual consciousness. It was made mainly of cast copper, which was polished to diminish the strength of the material, creating a smooth and luminous tactile experience. Such work indicated the lack of exploration in sexual themes in China, establishing Wu as an artistic pioneer at that time.

Wu was also an active participant in the Chinese modern art circle. He wanted to provide greater international exposure to Chinese art, and avidly explored and incorporated contemporary ideas in his works. In this sense, he was much bolder compared to his more conservative and conventional contemporaries who were hesitant in addressing sexual themes. As a result, he helped to begin a new chapter in modern Chinese art history.

In Austria Wu found a more liberal environment that allowed him the freedom to artistically express himself. He attempted to detach himself from the art movement in China, but found it a challenge. This made him feel like a foreigner both in China and in Austria. Thus, it would become inevitable for Wu to return to his identity, but keeping a global perspective. Some themes he explored included the concept of Yin and Yang – which relates to Chinese philosophy and traditional Chinese medicine.

== Later works ==
Living abroad allowed Wu to become more familiar with the relationship between art and commerce. He also witnessed what he felt were the detrimental effects of globalization on art. When visiting museums, Wu saw works by artists he respected as important voices of change commercialized and degraded to simple brand names, as their creations were reproduced on all types of consumer products.

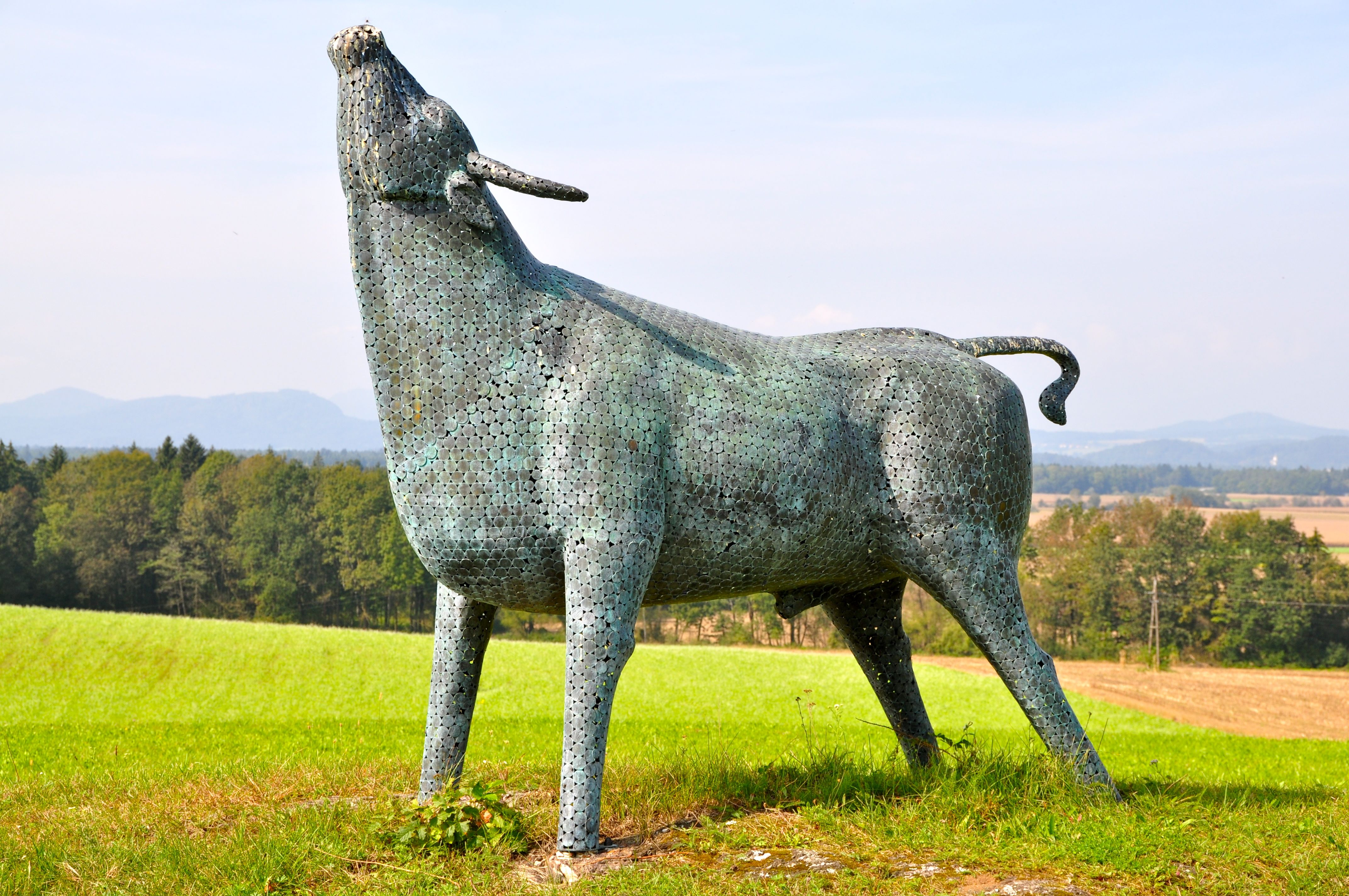
Bull of coins, Schloss Pakein, Grafenstein, Carinthia, Austria

The development of his past work along with a greater awareness of consumer culture enabled Wu to create his "Coin Series" in 1991, where he used coins as a medium for sculpting. For example, Apple, made up of 45,000 Austrian shilling coins, is recorded in The Guinness Book of Records in 1995 as the first and biggest coin sculpture in the world.

He uses coins to produce interpretations of both Western and Chinese sculptural forms, including Mao Zedong, Deng Xiaoping, Bill Gates, the Roman goddess of love, Venus, the logo of McDonald's, and a can of Coca-Cola. This would allow him to convey a strong social message, and to establish his individual artistic signature on the international art stage, earning him prominent recognition.

For his first solo exhibition - Coining MOMA (2001) - in the United States at Plum Blossoms gallery in New York, Wu Shaoxiang rendered with wielded coins his own representation of the permanent collection at The Museum of Modern Art, for example taking inspiration from Pablo Picasso, Alberto Giacometti, Aristide Maillol and Jasper Johns. In doing so, he was indicating that enterprises such as the MoMA were increasingly driven by business, carrying out nationwide publicity campaigns and reproducing famous works on gift items to sell them in museum shops. In fact, they had reduced artistic images to commercial images.

In his latest work, the "Walking Wealth" series, Wu continues to explore the theme of wealth and modern consumer culture, though this time using a new form of innovative sculptural representation - life-sized human figures made out of bronze-cast US dollar notes. As a postmodernist he had to deconstruct his "tradition" or reinterpret the "tradition" of his artistic education. Selecting the historical masterpieces of Western art - which are familiar to most educated Westerners - he could express the themes of his metaphorical messages in a more accessible way. With their unique body language and presentation, these anonymous figures are amusing commentaries on mankind's seemingly immense hunger for monetary fulfillment. In his worlds: "Inventions can free people from physical restrictions, but also lead to unexpected new restrictions. Currency is like this: It was invented to facilitate trade, but it came to dominate people's behavior and reasoning in the end. Coins can be used as a kind of normal material such as stone, wood or metal to make sculptures". The idea of money - illustrated by the coins and banknotes he uses - is in his mind completely incompatible with the actual value of the art.

The exact interpretation of his works, however, is still unclear and fuzzy, probably intentionally. In the history of sculpture, he is the first to use coins exclusively and persistently to make sculptures, going beyond the traditional definition of this art. The raw material used is material substance, but also an art form in itself.

Completed in 2007, his sculpture I Love M depicts a bust of Chairman Mao mounted on a plinth with the McDonald's logo. At the same time as referencing his childhood during the Cultural Revolution, I Love M is a commentary on the pervasiveness of capitalism and the way political figures become symbols over time.

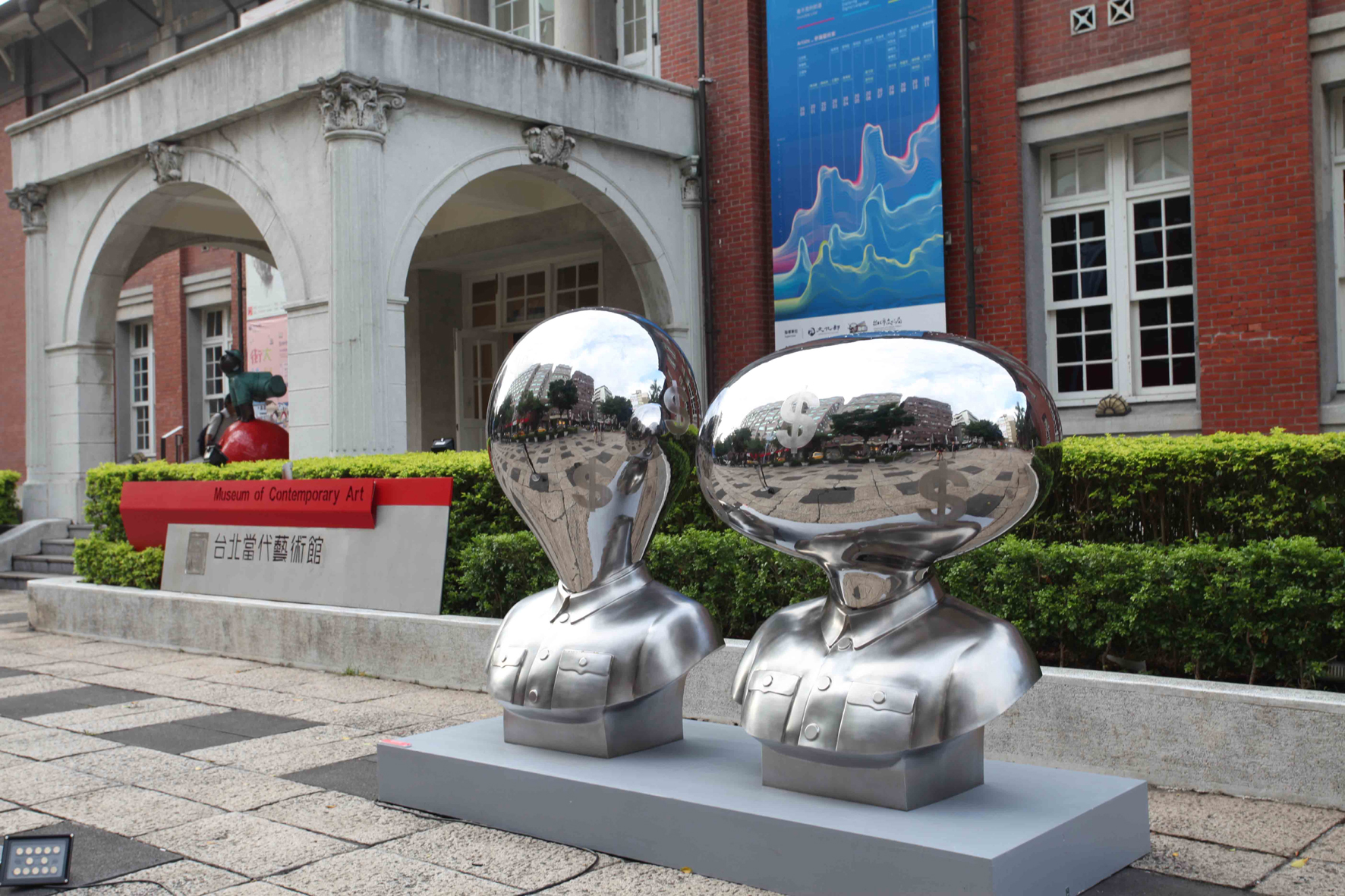
King and Queen, 2010, stainless steel, 150 x 231 x 80 cm, Museum of Contemporary Art Taipei, Taiwan

== Selected solo exhibitions ==
- Time Meteorite: Wu Shaoxiang Sculpture Works, Art Tianjin, Beijing Park, Tianjin, China, 2017
- Wu Shaoxiang, 30 years Exploration on the Art of Sculpture, Jiangxi Art Museum, Nanchang, China, 2016
- Desire Scenery - Retrospective, Tianjin Academy of Fine Arts, China, 2015
- Desire Scenery - Retrospective, Today Art Museum, Beijing, China, 2015
- Invisible Hand , together with Jiang Shuo, Linda Art Centre, 798, Beijing, China, 2015
- Dolls and Masks, National Museum of Indonesia, Jakarta, Indonesia, 2014
- Red VS Green, together with Jiang Shuo, Werner Berg Museum, Bleiburg, Austria, 2014
- Dolls and Masks, together with Jiang Shuo, Museum of Contemporary Art, Singapore, 2014
- Going for The Money, together with Jiang Shuo, Plum Blossoms Gallery, Hong Kong, 2014
- Camouflage, together with Jiang Shuo, Plum Blossoms Gallery, Hong Kong, 2013
- Going Forward! Going for Money!, Museum of Contemporary Art, Taipei, Taiwan, 2012
- Sculpture from China, Marsvinsholms skulpturpark, Sweden, 2011
- This Land so rich in Beauty, Plum Blossoms Gallery, Hong Kong, 2011
- Let's talk about money, Z-Art Centre, Shanghai, China, 2010
- Going Forward! Going for Money!, together with Jiang Shuo, Museum of Contemporary Art, Singapore, 2010
- New Age Cadre, White 8 Gallery, Vienna, Austria, 2010
- Tao Hua yuan, 798 Linda Gallery, Beijing, China, 2009
- Paradise Fruits, Art Seasons, Zurich, Switzerland, 2008
- Walking Wealth, Plum Blossoms Gallery, Hong Kong, 2008
- Jiang Shuo and Wu Shaoxiang Exhibition at Songzhuang Museum, Beijing, China, 2007
- Chase, Linda Gallery, Singapore, 2006
- Chase, Linda Gallery, Jakarta, Indonesia, 2006
- Sculptures and Paintings, Schloss Gabelhofen, Fohnsdorf, Austria, 2003
- Coining MoMA, Plum Blossoms Gallery, New York City, USA, 2001
- Wu Shaoxiang and Jiang Shuo, Schloss Wolfsberg, Wolfsberg, Austria, 2001
- Coining, AAI Gallery, Vienna, Austria, 2001
- Sculptures and Paintings, Gallery Synarte, Klagenfurt, Austria, 2000
- Wu Shaoxiang, Gallery Dida, Graz, Austria, 1999
- Red Memory, Plum Blossoms Gallery, Hong Kong, 1999
- Sculptures and Paintings, Salzburg Art Fair, Salzburg, Austria, 1999
- Wu Shaoxiang, Gallery Daghofer, Leoben, Austria, 1998
- Blander and Wu Shaoxiang, Funda Gallery, St.Veit/GL, Austria, 1998
- Wu Shaoxiang and Jiang Shuo, Gallery Zentrum, Graz, Austria, 1997
- Wu Shaoxiang and Jiang Shuo, Shellanda Company, Klagenfurt, Austria, 1997
- Sculptor, The Rotunda, Exchange Square, Hong Kong, 1996
- Wu Shaoxiang-New Works, Gallery Kolly, Graz, Austria, 1996
- The Art of Coining, Hanart Gallery, Taipei, Taiwan, 1995
- Recent Sculptures, Plum Blossoms Gallery, Hong Kong, 1994
- Sculptures and Paintings, Gallery Zentrum, Graz, Austria, 1993
- Sculptures and Paintings, Europe House, Klagenfurt, Austria, 1993
- Sculptures and Paintings, Gallery Nemenz, Judenberg, Austria, 1992
- Sculptures and Paintings, Gallery Akzent K, Stuttgart, Germany, 1991
- Sculptures, Gallery d' Art Teroema, Florence, Italy, 1991
- Apple, Messe Palast, Vienna, Austria, 1991
- Sculptures and Paintings, Gallery Burg Montendorf, Salzburg, Austria, 1991
- Sculptures and Paintings, Raiffeisen Gallery, Klagenfurt, Austria, 1991
- Joint exhibition with Jiang Shuo, Culture House, Knittelfeld, Austria, 1991
- Sculptures and Paintings, City Hall Gallery, Klagenfurt, Austria, 1990
- Dream, China National Art Gallery, Beijing, China, 1988
- Sculptures, Central Academy of Arts and Design, Beijing, China, 1987
- Two and Three Dimension, joined by Chen Xiaoyu, Central Academy of Fine Arts, Beijing, China, 1985

== Group exhibitions ==
- Chinese Dreams: Yi Kai and Wu Shaoxiang, Alisan Fine Arts, Hong Kong, 2018
- Redefining the City with Context • Beyond the Wall: Xi'an Contemporary Art Exhibition 2018, Xi'an Art Museum, Xi'an, China, 2018
- Money in Art, Kunst im Traklhaus, Salzburg, Austria, 2018
- Insight, Pingshan International Sculpture Exhibition, Shenzhen, China, 2018
- Art Basel, Presented by Alisan Fine Art Gallery, Hong Kong, 2018
- Art Stage Singapore, Presented by Linda Gallery, Singapore, 2018
- Art & Antique Vienna, Vienna, Austria Schütz Fine Art-Chinese Department, 2018
- Fair for Art Vienna, Vienna, Austria Schütz Fine Art-Chinese Department, 2018
- Art & Antique Residenz Salzburg (March and August), Salzburg, Austria, Schütz Fine Art-Chinese Department Art & Antique, 2018
- Art Vienna, Leopold Museum, Vienna, Austria Schütz Fine Art-Chinese Department, 2017
- Art & Antique Residenz Salzburg (March and August), Salzburg, Austria, Schütz Fine Art-Chinese Department Art & Antique, 2017
- Art & Antique Vienna, Vienna, Austria Schütz Fine Art-Chinese Department, 2017
- Contemporary Chinese Art, Vienna, Austria Schütz Fine Art-Chinese Department, 2017
- Art & Antique Hofburg Vienna, Vienna, Austria Schütz Fine Art-Chinese Department, 2017
- Art & Antique Residence Salzburg (March and August), Salzburg, Austria, Schütz Fine Art-Chinese Department, 2016
- Art Miami New York, Schütz Fine Art-Chinese Department, 2016
- 2015 Art Salzburg, Austria, Schütz Fine Art-Chinese Department, 2015
- Olympia Art Fair, Olympia, London, England, Schütz Fine Art-Chinese Department 2015
- Art & Antique Residenz Salzburg (March and August), Salzburg, Austria, Schütz Fine Art-Chinese Department, 2015
- 20 years Schütz Fine Art, Schütz Fine Art, Vienna, Austria, 2015
- Art & Antique Hofburg Vienna, Austria, Schütz Fine Art-Chinese Department, 2015
- Art Landing Singapore, Presented by Linda Gallery, Singapore, 2014
- Da Xiang You xin - Contemporary Chinese Sculpture Today, Songzhuan Art Centre, Beijing, China, 2013
- Art Beijing, Agriculture Exhibition Hall, Beijing, China, Linda Gallery, 2013
- Art Beijing, Agriculture Exhibition Hall, Beijing, China, Linda Gallery, 2012
- Art Taipei, Taiwan, Linda Gallery, 2012
- ART Beijing, Agriculture Exhibition Hall, Beijing, China, Linda Gallery, 2011
- International Gallery Exposition, China World Trade Centre, Beijing, China, presented by Linda Gallery, 2010
- Greeting with their Heart and Blood, 798 Linda Art Centre, Beijing, China, 2010
- ART Santa Fe, El Museo Cultural de Santa Fe, New Mexico, USA, Plum Blossoms Gallery, 2009
- Singapore Art Fair, Singapore, Linda Gallery, 2009
- ART Singapore, SUNTEC Singapore, Singapore, Linda Gallery, 2008
- Shanghai Art Fair 2007, Shanghai, China, 2007
- ARTSingapore 2007, The Contemporary Asian Art Fair, Singapore, 2007
- Art Beijing 2007, Beijing, China, 2007
- China International Gallery Exposition 2007, Beijing, China, 2007
- ArtSingapore 2006, Singapore, 2006
- The International Asian Art Fair, The Armoury, New York, USA, 2003
- Sculptures, Elizabeth Weiner Fine Art Gallery, Santa Monica, California, USA, 2003
- The International Asian Art Fair, Lincoln Art Centre, New York, USA, 2002
- Configurations, Plum Blossoms Gallery, New York, Hong Kong, 2002
- International Biennial of Contemporary Art Austria, Hüttenberg, Austria, 2002
- The International Asian Art Fair, The Armoury, New York, USA, 2001
- The International Pavilion of Palm Beach, Art Palm Beach, Florida, USA, 2001
- Salon de Mars, Geneva, Switzerland, 2001
- Chinese Figure, Hanart Gallery, Hong Kong, 2000
- The International Asian Art Fair, The Armoury, New York, USA, 2000
- The 20th Century Art, The Armoury, New York, USA, 2000
- The International Contemporary Art Fair, Los Angeles, USA, 1999
- Goedhuis Contemporary, London, United Kingdom, 2000
- The International Contemporary Art Fair, Palace Degli Affari, Florence, Italy, 1998
- Contemporary Austrian Painter, The Rotunda, Exchange Square, Hong Kong, 1998
- The International Asian Art Fair, The Armoury, New York, USA, 1997
- Contemporary Austrian Painter, The Rotunda, Exchange Square, Hong Kong, 1997
- Table for Two, LKF Gallery, Hong Kong, 1996
- The Collector's View, Hanart Gallery, Hong Kong, 1996
- Art Asia, Hong Kong Convention and Exhibition Centre, Hong Kong, 1995
- Budapest Art Expo, Budapest, Hungary, 1995
- New Trends Art Hong Kong, Hong Kong Convention and Exhibition Centre, Hong Kong, 1994
- Tresors Singapore, World Trade Centre, Singapore, 1994
- Art Asia, Hong Kong Convention and Exhibition Centre, presented by Plum Blossoms Gallery, Hong Kong, 1994
- The Spirit of Times, Gallery Hinteregger, St. Pölten, Austria, 1993
- Packaged Art, Bündner Art Museum, Chur, Switzerland, 1990
- International Art Exhibition, Stadgarden Gallery, Norden, Germany, 1990
- Avant-garde China, China National Art Gallery, Beijing, China, 1989
- New Expressionism in China, China National History Museum, Beijing, China, 1989
- 30 Years The Central Academy of Arts & Design, Central Academy of Arts and Design, Beijing, China, 1988
- Works by Young Beijing Artist, China National Art Gallery, Beijing, China, 1987
- Contemporary Chinese Fine Art, Toronto Exhibition Hall, Toronto, Canada, 1987
- Excellent Chinese Urban Sculptures, China National Art Gallery, Beijing, China, 1987
- Tradition and Modern - New Sculptures, China National Art Gallery, Beijing, China, 1987
- National Sculpture Exhibition, China National Art Gallery, Beijing, China, 1986
- New Works from Jingdezhen Ceramics Institute, Jingdezhen, 1982
- Ceramics Museum, Jingdezhen, China, 1982
- Jiang Xi Province Art Exhibition, Jiang Xi Revolution Museum, Nanchang, China, 1981
- National Art Academy's Drawing Exhibition, China Art Academy, Hangzhou, China, 1981

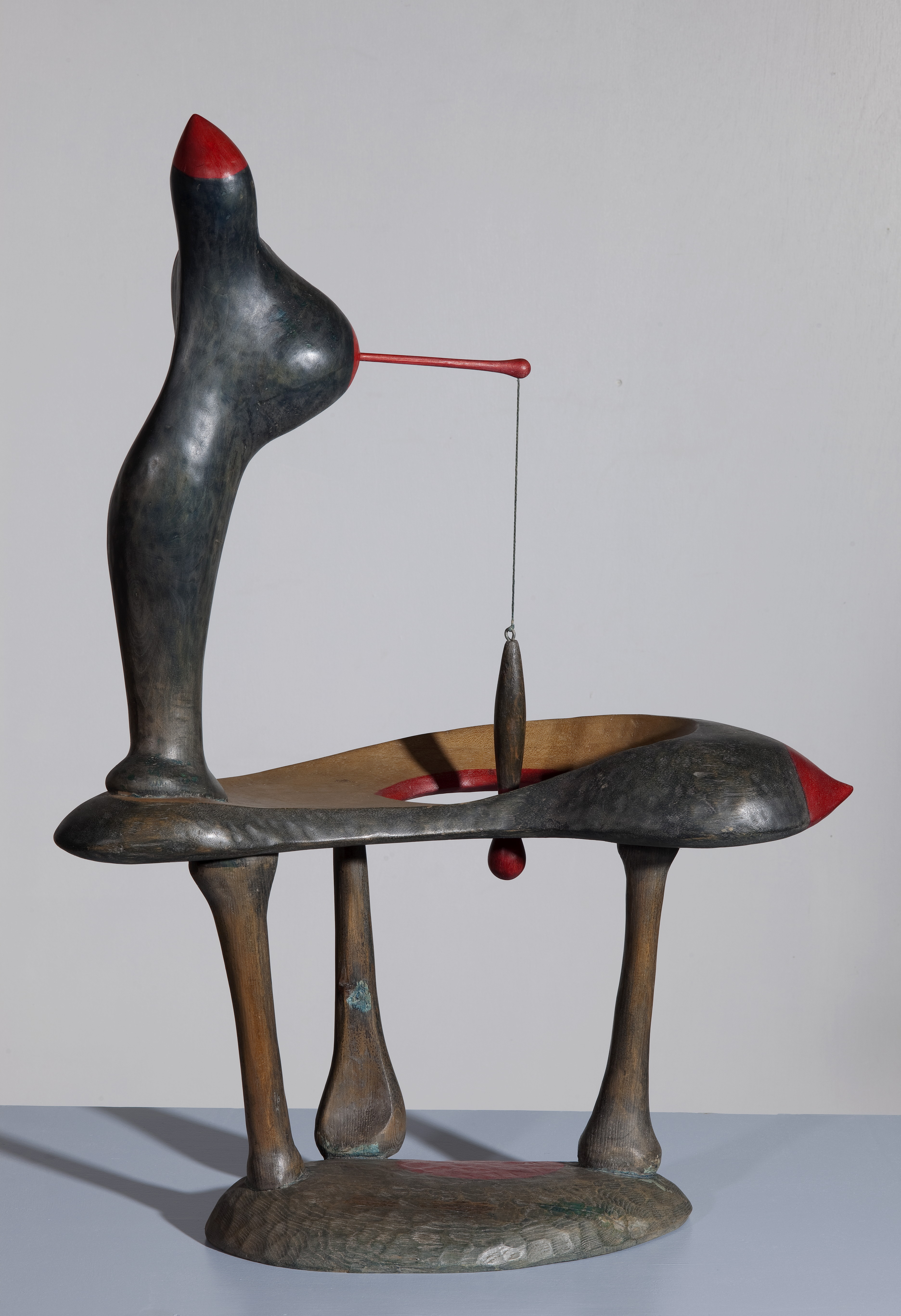
Shoe, 1986, wood, bamboo and rope, 92 cm

== Selected works ==
- Torso from the Louvre, bronze, 139 x 58 x 34 cm, Schütz Fine Art - Chinese Department, Vienna, Austria, 2018
- Naked Nike, bronze and stainless steel, 178 x 60 x 75 cm, Schütz Fine Art - Chinese Department, Vienna, Austria, 2016
- Fruits of Paradise, patinated bronze, 92 x 111 x 60 cm, Schütz Fine Art - Chinese Department, Vienna, Austria, 2008. Collaboration with Jiang Shuo
- Coining MoMA- Brâncuși, Tree, H.M.Z. Foundation, Fohnsdo, 2003
- Coining MOMA-Maillol. Shilling coins, 95 x 58 x 43 cm. 2001. Schütz Fine Art - Chinese Department, Vienna, Austria, 2001-2006
- Head From British Museum, Bowl, Torso, Cyber Club, Hong Kong, 2003
- Family III (fountain), Singulus, Umag, Croatia, 2003
- Harmonious (fountain), Ebental District Government, Ebenthal, Austria, 2002
- Harmonious (fountain), Wolkensberg Foundation, Klagenfurt, Austria, 2002
- Clouds VI, Celebrity Cruises, Miami, United States, 2002
- Torso From Louvre, RBB Bank Spittal, Spittal an der Drau, Austria, 2002
- Deng Xiaoping Souvenir Badge, Wadsworth Collection, New York, United States, 2001
- Patrick, Schloss Pakein, Grafenstein, Austria, 2001
- Pomegrante, Barmherzigen Bruder Hospital, St. Veit, Austria, 2001
- Circulate, Volksbank Karnten Sud, Klagenfurt, Austria, 2001
- Fountain, Villa Ried, St.Veit, Austria, 2000
- Mao, Venus From British Museum, Crow Art Museum, Dallas, United States, 1999
- Head From Gugenheim, Kärnten State Government, Carinthia, Austria, 1999
- Man On Peach, Hypo Landesbank, Klagenfurt, Austria, 1999
- Goddess, Leoben City Government, Leoben, Austria, 1998
- Venus, RBB Bank, Klagenfurt, Austria, 1998
- Cloud, Villa Borovnik, Ferlach, Austria, 1998
- Goddess, Beijing Silver Tower, Beijing, China, 1998
- The Moon, LKH 2000 Sculpture Park, Karnten State Government, Klagenfurt, Austria, 1997
- Gentle Breath, Björn Borg Collection, Stockholm, Sweden, 1997
- Coin, Control Bank, Vienna, Austria, 1997
- Venus, RBB Bank, Klagenfurt, Austria, 1997
- Sepe, State Icehockey Hall, Klagenfurt, Austria, 1997
- Family (fountain), Starmann Company, Klagenfurt, Austria, 1996
- Enjoyable (fountain), County Attendant Centre, County Government, Moosburg, Austria, 1996
- Torso, Schwarzneger Art collection, Los Angeles, United States, 1996
- Winged Source (fountain), Ford Sintsching, Klagenfurt, Austria, 1995
- Banana, Hanart Gallery, Hong Kong, 1995
- The Moon, Renaissance Hotel, Hong Kong, 1995
- The Great Venus of 20th Century, New World Centre, Kowloon, Hong Kong, 1995
- Gentle Breath, New World Hotel, Shenzhen, China, 1995
- Harmonius, italian marmor, 46 x 56 x 15 cm, Schütz Fine Art - Chinese Department, Vienna, Austria, 1994
- The Seed of Jade, RBB Bank, Klagenfurt, Austria, 1994
- The Great Venus of 20th Century, Wing on Art Collection St. Paul, De Veuce, France, 1994
- Head, Klagenfurt City Gallery, Klagenfurt, Austria, 1994
- Inner Movement, DAF Aichwalder, Klagenfurt, Austria, 1993
- Flutist, House Hinteregger, St. Pölten, Austria, 1993
- Turning Figure, City Government, St.Veit/Glan, Austria, 1993
- Window, Raiffeisen Lands Bank, Klagenfurt, Austria, 1993
- Hand (Fountain), Köck Villa, Velden, Austria, 1992
- Telephon, Gallery Akzent K, Stuttgart, Germany, 1992
- Apple, National Bank, Vienna, Austria, 1991
- Sitting Girl, Treibach Sport Centre, Treibach, Austria, 1991
- Heavenly Dog, Hardy Collection Museum, Pörtschach, Austria, 1991
- Turning Figure, Karnten State Culture Council, Klagenfurt, Austria, 1991
- Gentle Breath, Oesterreichische Nationalbank, Vienna, Austria, 1990
- Dancing Spirit, Stroh Centre, Klagenfurt, Austria, 1990
- Family (fountain), local government, St Veit, Austria, 1989
- Victory, The Revolution Monument, Shijiazhuang City, Shijiazhuang, China, 1988
- City Symbol Sculpture, Luzhu City, China, 1988
- Meditation, Europe Sculpture Park, Klagenfurt, Austria, 1988
- The Four Feelings, China Association of letters and Arts, Beijing, China, 1987
- The See of Knowledge, Central University of Finance, Beijing, China, 1987
- Masks, Beijing International Hotel, Beijing, China, 1987
- Bath, The Central Academy of Arts and Design, Beijing, China, 1987
- Spring, Bin River Park, Beijing City Government, Beijing, China, 1986

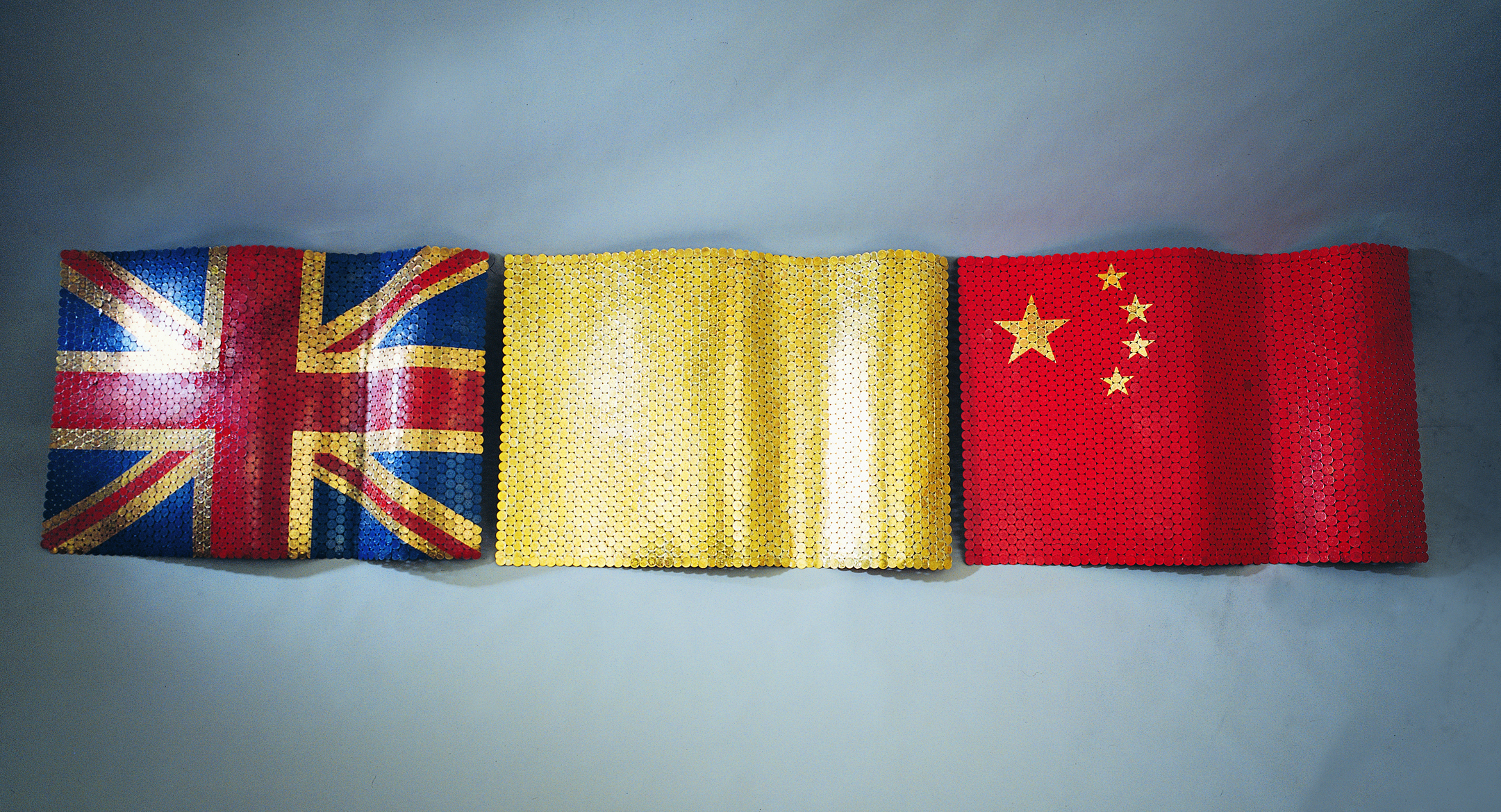
The Flags of Hong Kong, 1994, Hong Kong dollar coins, 70 x 313 x 9 cm, Hong Kong Art Museum collection

== See also ==
- Jiang Shuo
- Central Academy of Fine Arts

== Bibliography ==
- Gao Minglu (2010). Wu Shaoxiang Works. Shuimu Art Space, Beijing.
- Linda Ma (2016). Invisible Hand. Linda Gallery, Beijing.
- Linda Ma (2014). Wu Shaoxiang & Jiang Shuo. Linda Gallery, Beijing.
- Xu Liang (2016). Wu Shaoxiang, Collected Works. Today Art Museum Publishing House LTD, Beijing.
- McGuinness Stephen (2003). Wu Shaoxiang. Plum Blossoms Gallery, New York, Hong Kong, Singapore.
- Xu Liang (2015). Wu Shaoxiang. Today Art Museum Publishing House LTD, Beijing.
