= Hu Yanyan =

Hu Yanyan (Chinese: 胡妍妍) is the president and director of China Guardian, the fourth largest auction house in the world. In 2015 she was named by the Financial Times as one of the five most powerful women in Asia's art world.

== Early life and education ==
She graduated from Nankai University with a Master of museology.

== Career ==
After completing her studies she worked as an editor for publications at the Beijing Municipal Administration of Cultural Heritage. She joined China Guardian in 1993 as a specialist in paintings and calligraphy.

She launched the “Ancient Chinese paintings and calligraphy” auction category in 1998, and the “Chinese contemporary paintings and calligraphy" auction category in 2006, which has become the company's most popular category.
