= Chen Qi (artist) =

Chinese artist

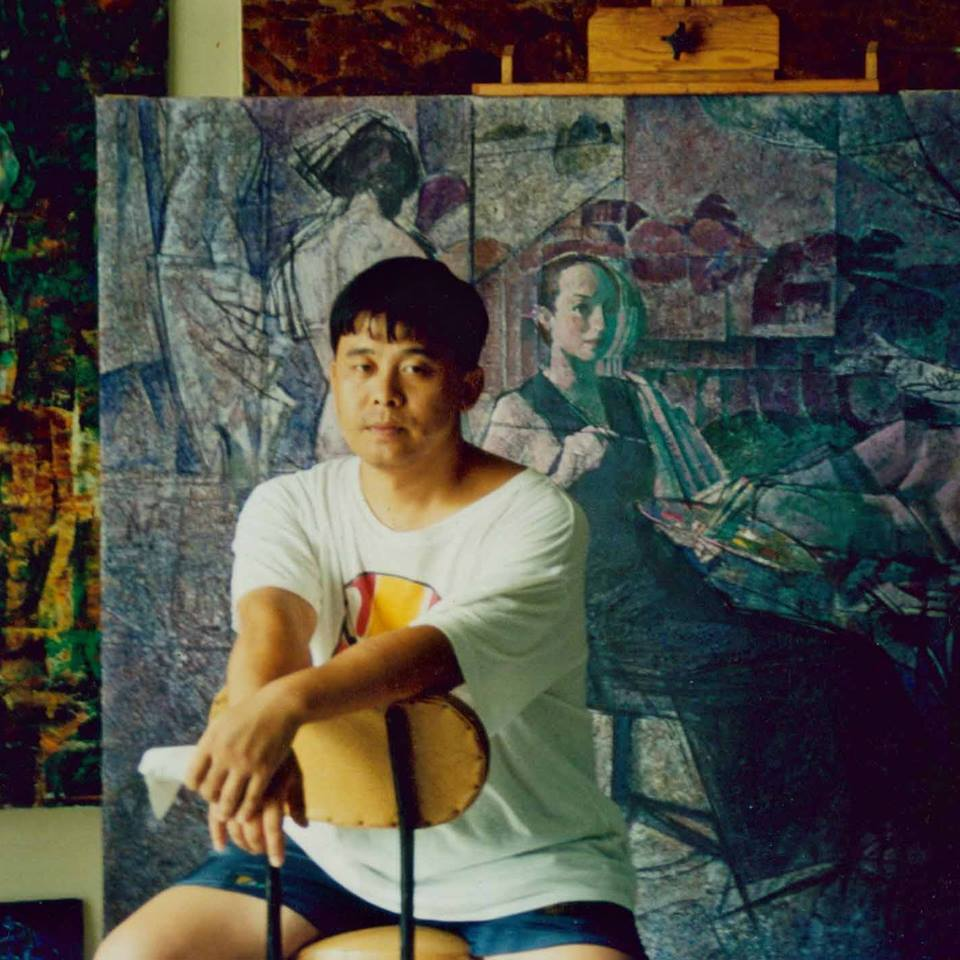
- Chen Qi in 2008
- Born: Shenyang, China
- Education: Lu Xun Academy of Fine Arts
- Known for: Painting, drawing, printmaking, ceramics, stage design, writing
- Movement: Expressionism, Surrealism

Chen Qi
- Traditional Chinese: 陳奇
- Simplified Chinese: 陈奇
Transcriptions
Standard Mandarin
- Hanyu Pinyin: Chén Qí
- Wade–Giles: Ch'en Ch'i

Chen Qi (pinyin: Chén Qí; Wade–Giles: Ch'en Ch'i; born as 陳奇 in 1956) is a Chinese artist and co-founder of the Amphibism Art movement in early 1990s. Chen was born in Shenyang, China, in the midst of Great Leap Forward. After 1989, he moved to Singapore, and in 2015 he moved to California. Chen is best known for his figurative oil and ink paintings, which fuse Western and Eastern painting techniques into a whole new genre.

== Biography ==
In 1989, Chen and several Chinese artists, including Jin Shangyi and Wu Guanzhong, participated in the "Oil Paintings of Modern Day China" exhibition at the International Trade Centre in Singapore. Chen's nude painting was hailed by art critic Tan Tee Chie as "one of those with highest art value". In 1990, Chen held his first solo exhibition in Singapore with sponsorship the Hongxiang Art Centre of Singapore and the Chinese Ministry of Culture.

== Style and technique ==
Chen's artistic style, which he terms as Amphibism, focuses on innovations in the use of light and color. His artistic ideas were inspired by Diego Velázquez, Peter Paul Rubens, and Rembrandt. In terms of his use of light, reflection, and limited space, Chen draws on 19th century painters such as Claude Monet, Vincent van Gogh, and Paul Cézanne, as well as upon the techniques of Georges Rouault and Balthus. He has credited German Expressionism for his use of color to express thoughts and emotions.

== Selected works and exhibitions ==
- 1989, Back of Nude, Oil Painting Art from China – International Art Show, Selected Group Show, International Trade Centre, Singapore.
- 1990, Selected Works of Oil Paintings, White Mountain and Black Water Exhibition, Selected Group Show, Sponsored by Ministry of Culture of Singapore, Singapore.
- 1990, Nudes and Still Life-Oil Paintings of Chen Qi, Solo Exhibition, Sponsored by Hongxiang Art Centre of Singapore and Ministry of Culture of China, Singapore
- 1990, Oil Paintings of Chen Qi, Solo Exhibition, Sponsored by Dragon Gate Art Gallery, Singapore
- 1994, Solo Exhibition of Chen Qi, Solo Exhibition, Sponsored by Singapore Art Gallery, Papua
- 1996, Chen Qi's Portrait Art Painting, Solo Exhibition, Sponsored by Dragon Gate Gallery, Switzerland
- 1997–2006, Plein Air Paintings of Chen Qi, Solo Exhibition, Deutschland Cruise Liner, Germany
- 2007, Chen Qi's Ink Paintings, Solo, Sponsored by ARE Groups, Singapore
- 2011 May, Lovely Child — Ink Paintings of Chen Qi, Solo Exhibition, Sponsored by Artist Association of Gansu, Gansu, China
- 2011 July, Amphibism Exploration — Chen Qi's Ink Paintings of Amphibism Movement, Solo Exhibition, Artists Association of Canton, Guangzhou, China
- 2011 July, Manchurian Dream and Echoes in Chen Qi's Ink Paintings, Solo Exhibition, Museum of Mukden Palace, Shenyang, China
- 2011 July, 90 Years of Glory — Ink paintings and Calligraphies from Great Masters of Art, Group Exhibition, Yulin, China
- 2011 Sep, Plein Air Oil Paintings and Portrait Ink Paintings of Master Chen Qi, Solo exhibition, Gansu, Tianshui, China
- 2011 Sep, Mother and Children Series, Ink Paintings, Praise to Peace Art Exhibition, as part of the World Peace Day Memorial Events And Forums of Peace and Development in North-East Asia, Sponsored by Art Gallery of Luxun Academy of Fine Art, Shenyang, China
- 2012 Jan, Good Old Days, Golden Memories — Portrait Arts of Chen Qi, Solo Exhibition, Museum of Mukden Palace, Shenyang, China
- 2014 April, Lovely Child, Ink Paintings, Art Revolution Taipei 2014, Taipei, Taiwan
- 2014 July, Mother and Children, Ink Paintings, 15th Dalian International Art Show, Dalian, China
- 2015 July, Lovely Child, Ink Paintings, 16th Dalian International Art Show, Dalian, China

== See also ==
- Culture of Singapore
