= Old Xian =

Chinese artist

Old Xian (Old先) is an artist based in Hangzhou, China. He presents himself as a male character in his comics. He graduated from the Central Academy of Fine Arts (CAFA) in 2013. In 2012, he released The Specific Heat Capacity of Love and Xiao Chou Dan Ni (a.k.a. Joker Danny). Xiao Chou Dan Ni earned Xian a Shueisha Tezuka Award and a Golden Dragon Award. He has also worked on Mosspaca Advertising Department, in collaboration with his coworker Tan Jiu, who produced Tamen De Gushi. He is well known for his manhua 19 Days.
