= Ben Gu =

Chinese librarian

Gu Ben
- Born: 顾犇; December 11, 1961 (age 64); Shanghai, China
- Other names: 三牛, 书蠹精, Mandarin Bookworm, Benjamin Gu, 구벤, Бэнь Гу
- Education: Fudan University (1980－1987)
- Occupation: National Library of China
- Known for: librarian & translator

Ben Gu (name in Chinese order: Gu Ben; simplified Chinese: 顾犇; traditional Chinese: 顧犇 or 頋犇; Pinyin: Gù Bēn; born in Shanghai, China, on 11 December 1961) is a librarian, translator and library science researcher. He received his M.S. degree in Mathematics in Fudan University in 1987, and got his Ph.D. degree in Information Science in Renmin University of China (The People's University of China) in 2000. He translated many scholarly works in musicology, philosophy, history and library science, and compiled several books in library acquisitions and library cataloging. He was awarded by the State Council for his special contributions in library science.

He also writes under various pen names, such as Mandarin Bookworm, Bookworm (书蠹精) and Sanniu (三牛), and sometimes uses Benjamin Gu (or Benjamin Kupên) as his English name. There are some variations of his name, including 구벤 (Korean), Pen Ku (Wade–Giles Romanization) and Бэнь Гу (Russian).

== Biography ==
Ben Gu's grandfather was born in Suzhou, China, not far from Shanghai. His parents were born in Shanghai in the 1930s.

During his school days, Ben Gu enjoyed electronics, shooting, percussion instruments and trumpet, and learning the Russian language. After entering high school, Ben Gu began to excel in pure mathematics and received one of the top prizes in Shanghai Municipal Mathematical Competition. He studied in the Department of Mathematics, Fudan University, and achieved excellent academic records every year.

As a graduate student in the Institute of Mathematics, Fudan University, he focused his research on partial differential equations. His Master's thesis "Reflection of Singularities at Boundary for Piecewise Smooth Solutions to Semilinear Hyperbolic Systems" was published in the Journal of Partial Differential Equations. During this period, he began to be interested in the Humanities.

In his university years, he also learnt several other languages, notably English, German, French and Italian. These languages became important tools for his later academic research and translation. In July 1987, he became a book selector in the National Library of China, and began to translate scholarly works in his spare time.

During 1997–2000, he studied in Renmin University of China as a part-time graduate student, and focused his research on information sociology under the advice of Prof. Yu Chen. He received his Ph.D. degree in 2000. He wrote several articles and books on library acquisitions in the 1990s, conducted research in library cataloging since 2004, and has worked towards the internationalization of Chinese library cataloging since 2005.

== Education ==
- September 1997-July 2000: graduate student, Business School, Renmin University of China (The People's University of China); Ph.D. in management;
- September 1984-July 1987: graduate student, Institute of Mathematics, Fudan University; M.S. in mathematics;
- September 1980-July 1984: student, Department of Mathematics, Fudan University; B.S. in mathematics.

== Work Experience ==
- January 2011- : Director, Foreign Acquisitions & Cataloging Department, National Library of China
- January 2008-December 2010: Director, Chinese Acquisitions & Cataloging Department, National Library of China / Online Library Cataloging Center / ISSN China Centre
- September 2004-December 2007: Director, Acquisitions & Cataloging Department / Online Library Cataloging Center, National Library of China
- January 1999-September 2004: Deputy Director, Acquisitions & Cataloging Department, National Library of China
- February 1998-January 1999: Director, Foreign Acquisitions & Cataloging Center, National Library of China
- February–August 1995: Exchange Librarian, Asian Collections, National Library of Australia
- March 1989-November 1998: Chief, Foreign Book Selection Section, National Library of China
- July 1987-March 1989: Book Selector, Acquisitions Committee, National Library of China

== Titles in Professional Organizations ==
- September 2007-August 2015: Member, ISBD (International Standard Bibliographic Description) Review Group, Cataloguing Section, IFLA (International Federation of Library Associations and Institutions)
- August 2005-August 2009: Secretary of the IFLA Cataloguing Section and Member of the Coordinating Board of the Division IV (Bibliographical Control), IFLA
- November 2005-October 2014: Vice-chair, Committee for Resource Development & Sharing, Library Society of China
- July 2005- : Peer Review Expert, National Social Science Foundation of China (National Planning Office of Philosophy and Social Sciences)
- May 2005-May 2013: Standing Committee Member, IFLA Cataloguing Section
- November 2004-November 2009: Council Member, Translators' Association of China
- March 2001- : Member, Academic Research Committee, National Library of China
- September 2000- : Member, Library Society of China
- May 1998-September 2001: Member, Professional Committee for the Translation of Works in Library Science in Foreign Languages, China Society for Library Science (Library Society of China)

== Titles in Social Organizations ==
- December 2008- : Member, Association of Senior Members of the Youth Federation of the Central Government Departments
- February 2006-February 2011: Standing Committee Member, Youth Federation of the Ministry of Culture
- October 2000-February 2006: Member, Youth Federation of the Ministry of Culture
- June 1995-September 2005: Member, Youth Federation of the Central Government Departments
- June 1995-July 2000: Member, All-China Youth Federation

== Major Prizes and Awards ==
- February 18, 2008: Chinese Language Working Group for the 73rd IFLA General Conference received NLC Director's Special Prize.
- May 2006: Third Prize of the Award of Cultural and Art Sciences, Ministry of Culture, for Descriptive Cataloguing Rules for Western Language Materials (Revised and Enlarged Edition).
- December 2005: Received Special Governmental Subsidy of the State Council for the Year 2004.
- September 1996: Awarded for Excellent Work in the Preparation of 62nd IFLA General Conference.
- May 1996: Excellent Young People, Administration Bureau of Ministries under the Central Government.
- January 1996: Excellent Young People, Ministry of Culture.
- January 1995: Excellent Young People, National Library of China.

== Works ==
=== Major Translations ===
- The Arch of Knowledge: An Introductory Study of the History of the Philosophy and Methodology of Science / David Oldroyd (As first co-translator, Chinese translation published in 2008)
- ISBD Preliminary Consolidated Edition (Chinese translation published in 2008)
- Functional requirements for bibliographic records: final report (As co-translator, Chinese translation published in 2008)
- ISBD(PM) International Standard Bibliographic Description for Printed Music. Second revised edition (Chinese translation published in 2001)
- The Concise Oxford History of Music / Gerald Abraham (Chinese translation published in 2000)
- Awakening of Europe / Philippe Wolff (As co-translator, Chinese translation published in 1990)

=== Major Books ===
- Handbook of Library Acquisitions (As editor-in-chief, published in Chinese in 2004)
- Descriptive Cataloguing Rules for Western Language Materials (Revised and Enlarged Edition) (As editor-in-chief, published in Chinese in 2003)
- Catalog of Rare Books in Foreign Languages in the National Library of China (As editor-in-chief, published in 2001)

=== Major Articles in English and Other Western Languages ===
- "National Bibliographies: the Chinese experience", Alexandria: The Journal of National and International Library and Information Issues published with the British Library by Ashgate Publishing Ltd., ISSN 0955-7490, Vol. 18, No. 3, 2006 (Published in March 2007), pp. 173–178.
- "Le bibliografie nazionali: il caso della Cina", Bollettino AIB : Rivista italiana di biblioteconomia e scienze dell'informazione, ISSN 1121-1490, Settembre 2006 (Vol. 46, n. 3), p. 255-261.
- "National Bibliographies: the Chinese experience", presentation at World Library and Information Congress (72nd IFLA General Conference and Council), 20–24 August 2006, Seoul, Korea (PDF file at IFLA site)
- "Chinese Cataloging Rules and International Cataloguing Principles: a Report of Similarities and Differences", presentation at the 4th IFLA Meeting of Experts on an International Cataloguing Code, August 16–18, 2006, Seoul, Korea (Jointly with Ms. Qinfang Xie, Mr. Shaoping Wang and Prof. Songlin Wang), IFLA cataloguing principles : steps towards an international cataloguing code, 4 : report from the 4th IFLA Meeting of experts on an international cataloguing code, Seoul, Korea, 2006 / edited by Barbara B. Tillett, Jaesun Lee, and Ana Lupe Cristán. -- München : K.G. Saur, 2007. (IFLA Series on Bibliographic Control; Vol. 31). PP. 415–424 (English version); pp. 425–438 (Chinese version: 《中国文献编目规则》和《国际编目原则》之间的异同); pp. 439–454 (Japanese version); pp. 455–467 (Korean version)
- "China National Bibliography at the Crossroad / 기로에 선 중국의 국가서지", [Paper presented to the] Symposium on 21st Century Cataloging and National Bibliography Policy, October 18, 2005, held at The National Library of Korea. [Seoul] : The National Library of Korea, October 2005, pp. 165–174 (Korea version: pp. 175–185).
- "Collection Development Policy of the National Library of China", CDNLAO Newsletter, ISSN 1344-722X, No. 53 (July 2005). (Original HTML File)
- "Automation of Processes in the National Library of China: Historical Review and Future Perspective", Alexandria: The Journal of National and International Library and Information Issues published with the British Library by Ashgate Publishing Ltd., ISSN 0955-7490, Vol. 14, No. 3 (November 2002), pp. 133–139.
- "Western language books in the Beijing Library: criteria for acquisition and the method of selection", Learned Publishing, ISSN 0953-1513, Vol. 12, No. 1 (January 1999), pp. 33–40.
- "Reflection of Singularities at Boundary for Piecewise Smooth Solutions to Semilinear Hyperbolic Systems" （"半线性双曲组的分片光滑解在边界上的奇性反射"）, Journal of Partial Differential Equations（《偏微分方程》杂志）, Vol. 2, No.1, (1989), pp. 59–70.
