= Carlshütte =

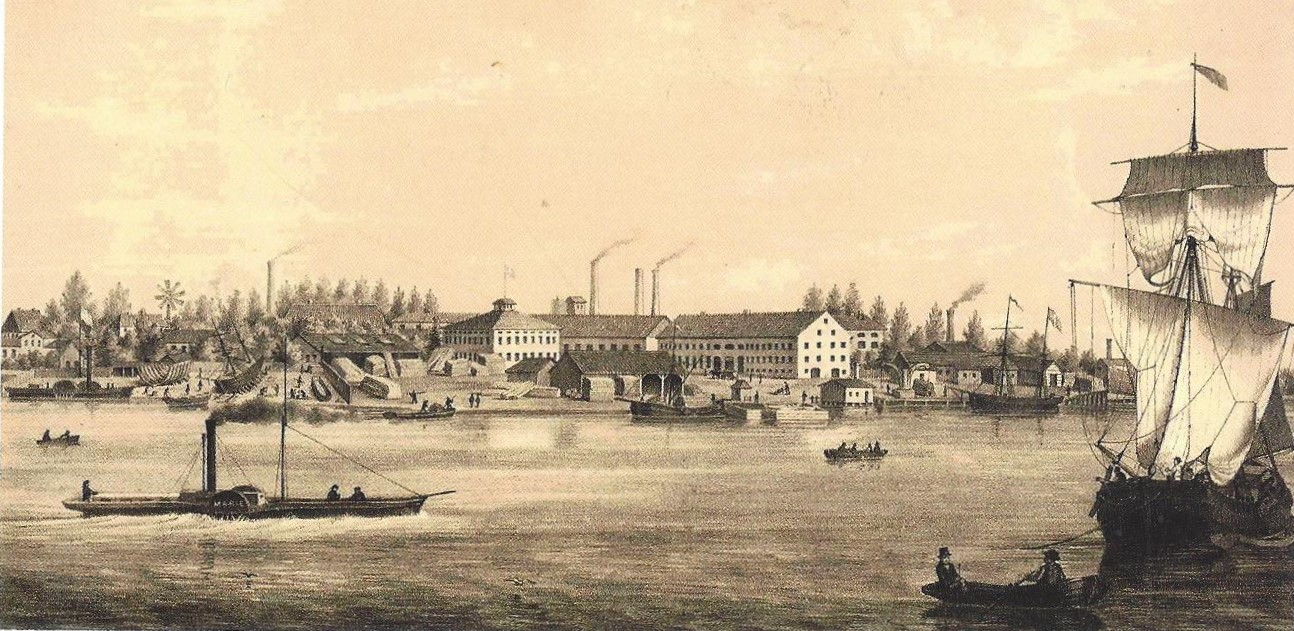
- Carlshütte near Rendsburg in 1856
- Native name: Ahlmann-Carlshütte KG
- Industry: Steel industry
- Founded: 1827; 199 years ago in Büdelsdorf, Duchy of Holstein
- Defunct: 1997
- Headquarters: Rendsburg
- Owner: Ahlmann family

Carlshütte (officially Ahlmann-Carlshütte KG) was a German steel foundry and iron mill headquartered in Büdelsdorf, Germany.

== History ==
Founded in 1827 it was the largest of its industry in Northern Germany with 3,000 employees at its peak in the 1960s. The company went into insolvency for the first time in 1974 and in 1997 for a second and ultimate time.

Although there is no direct successor company, ACO, Inc., was founded on the premises of Carlshütte, already in 1946 by Josef-Severin Ahlmann (1926–2006), son of Julius Ahlmann and Käthe Ahlmann (née Braun), who both where the owners of Carlshütte. ACO remains in the ownership of the Ahlmann family to this day.
