= Yu Chen (artist) =

Chinese artist (born 1963)

Yu Chen (Chinese: 余陈) is a contemporary Chinese artist and professor at the Central Academy of Fine Arts.

== Early life ==
Chen was born in the Guizhou province of China in 1963. She has a brother named Chen Yu. She graduated from the Guizhou Art Institute in 1981 and the Central Academy of Fine Art in Beijing in 1988.

== Art ==
Chen is best known for her Red Babies (红孩儿) series, which features portraits of Chinese children in Mao suits and other Communist garb. Some of the portraits in the series bear a likeness to Mao Zedong and other well-known Communist officials. The title Red Babies (红孩儿) carries a double meaning, simultaneously referring to children born in Communist China and to the Red Boy from the Chinese epic Journey to the West.

Her works have been sold at various notable auction houses, including Sotheby's, Christie's, and China Guardian Auctions.

== Exhibitions ==
Yu Chen's major exhibitions include:

=== Solo exhibitions ===
- Red Babies, Schoeni Art Gallery, Beijing (2003)
- Red Babies, Schoeni Art Gallery, Hong Kong (2003)
- Red Babies II, Schoeni Art Gallery, Hong Kong (2005)

=== Group exhibitions ===
- 1st Annual World of Women Artists, Museum of the Central Academy of Fine Arts, Beijing (1990)
- Chinese Contemporary Engraving Exhibition, Portland Museum, Portland, USA (1996)
- Exhibition for the Teachers from the Engraving Department of the Central Academy of the Arts, Museum of the Central Academy of Fine Arts, Beijing (1998)
- Out of the Box, Art Scene China, Hong Kong (1999)
- Group Exhibition, Hanmo Art Gallery, Beijing (2001)
- Invitational Exhibition of Fine Sketches from Chinese Academies of Art, Yan Huang Art Museum, Beijing (2001)
- International Women Artists' Exhibition, the National Museum of Fine Arts, Beijing (2001)
- Open Your Eyes, Chen Yu and Yu Chen, Lotus Arts de Vivre and Schoeni Art Gallery, Bangkok (2003)
- Through the Artists' Eyes - A Tribute to Manfred Schoeni, Schoeni Art Gallery, Hong Kong (2004)
- Made in China, Opera Gallery, London (2006)
- Beyond the Canvas, Schoeni Art Gallery, Hong Kong (2006)
- The Chen Family, Schoeni Art Gallery, Hong Kong (2006)
- Made in China, Opera Gallery, New York, USA (2007)
- RE-collection, A Retrospective Look at 15 Years of Art & Vision”, Schoeni Art Gallery's 15th Anniversary Exhibition, Schoeni Art Gallery, Hong Kong (2007)
- The Chen Family, Today Art Museum, Beijing (2008)
- The Chinese Approach, Ann Nathan Gallery, Chicago (2008)
- WO.MEN - We Are Our Own Women, Schoeni Art Gallery, Hong Kong (2010)
- Latitude/Attitude: 20th Anniversary Exhibition, Schoeni Art Gallery, Hong Kong (2012)
- "The Chen Family", YCL Gallery, Beijing (2014)
- "Day Dreamer", YCL Gallery, Beijing (2014)
- Art Stage Singapore 2016 (2016)

== See also ==
- Central Academy of Fine Arts
