= Central Academy of Fine Arts =

Art academy in the People's Republic of China

- 中央美术学院
- Former name: National Beijing Art College
- Type: Public
- Established: 1918; 108 years ago
- President: Lin Mao (林茂)
- Party Secretary: Gao Hong (高洪)
- Faculty: 572
- Students: 4,700
- Location: Beijing, China
- Campus: Urban, 33 ha (82 acres)
- Website: www.cafa.edu.cn

Chinese name
- Simplified Chinese: 中央美术学院
- Traditional Chinese: 中央美術學院
Transcriptions
Standard Mandarin
- Hanyu Pinyin: Zhōngyāng Měishù Xuéyuàn
- Wade–Giles: Chungyang Meishu Hsüehyüan
- IPA: [ʈʂʊ́ŋjáŋ mèɪʂû ɕɥěɥɛ̂n]
Yue: Cantonese
- Yale Romanization: Jūngyāng Měishùh Sywéywàhn
- Jyutping: Zung1 joeng1 Mei5 seot6 Hok6 jyun2
- IPA: [tsʊ́ŋjœ́ŋ me̬isɵ̀t hɔ̀ːkjy̌ːn]

The Central Academy of Fine Arts or CAFA is an art academy under the direct charge of the Ministry of Education of China. The Manila Bulletin calls the school "China's most prestigious and renowned art academy." It is considered one of the most selective schools in the country and turns away more than 90% of its applicants each year.

== Overview ==
The history of the National Art School in Beiping (国立北平艺术专科学校) dates back to the founding of the National School of Fine Arts in Beijing in 1918, advocated by the educator Cai Yuanpei. It was the first national school of fine arts in China and also the beginning of Chinese modern education of fine arts. The academy was founded in April 1950, as a result of the merger between the National Art School in Beiping and the department of fine arts at the third campus of North China University. The former principals of CAFA include Xu Beihong, Jiang Feng, Wu Zuoren, Gu Yuan, Jin Shangyi, Pan Gongkai, and Fan Di'an. Lin Mao has been the president since 2023. The current director of academic commission is Jin Shangyi.

The design programme of CAFA was renewed in 1995 in the name of the Department of Art Design, after a break of some 40 years, and became the School of Design in October 2002. For preparing and training the students as future professionals in design with creative thinking and practical capabilities, the School of Design offers undergraduate, graduate and Ph.D. degrees in programs ranging from visual communication design, product design, fashion design, photography, digital media to design theory and history. The School of Design plays an important role in promoting design in China and is actively involved in various design activities, most notably its designs for the 2008 Beijing Olympics, as well as the establishment of the Academy of Arts & Design at Tsinghua University (previously known as the Central Academy of Fine Art's Huadong Campus).

The new CAFA Art Museum, designed by Japanese architect Arata Isozaki, is located at the northeast corner of CAFA campus at No.8, Huajiadi Nan Street, Wangjing, with an area of 3546 m^{2} and a total floor area of 14,777 m^{2}. The Museum opened in October 2008 for the University's 90th anniversary. The new six-floor museum has several notable collections, including over 2,000 historic Chinese scroll paintings from the Ming Dynasty. The museum hosts rotating exhibitions.

The school drew media attention during the 1989 Tiananmen Square protests and massacre when the students created a large statue called the Goddess of Democracy. Each of the eight art academies signed a statement explaining the purpose of the statue.

== Schools and colleges ==
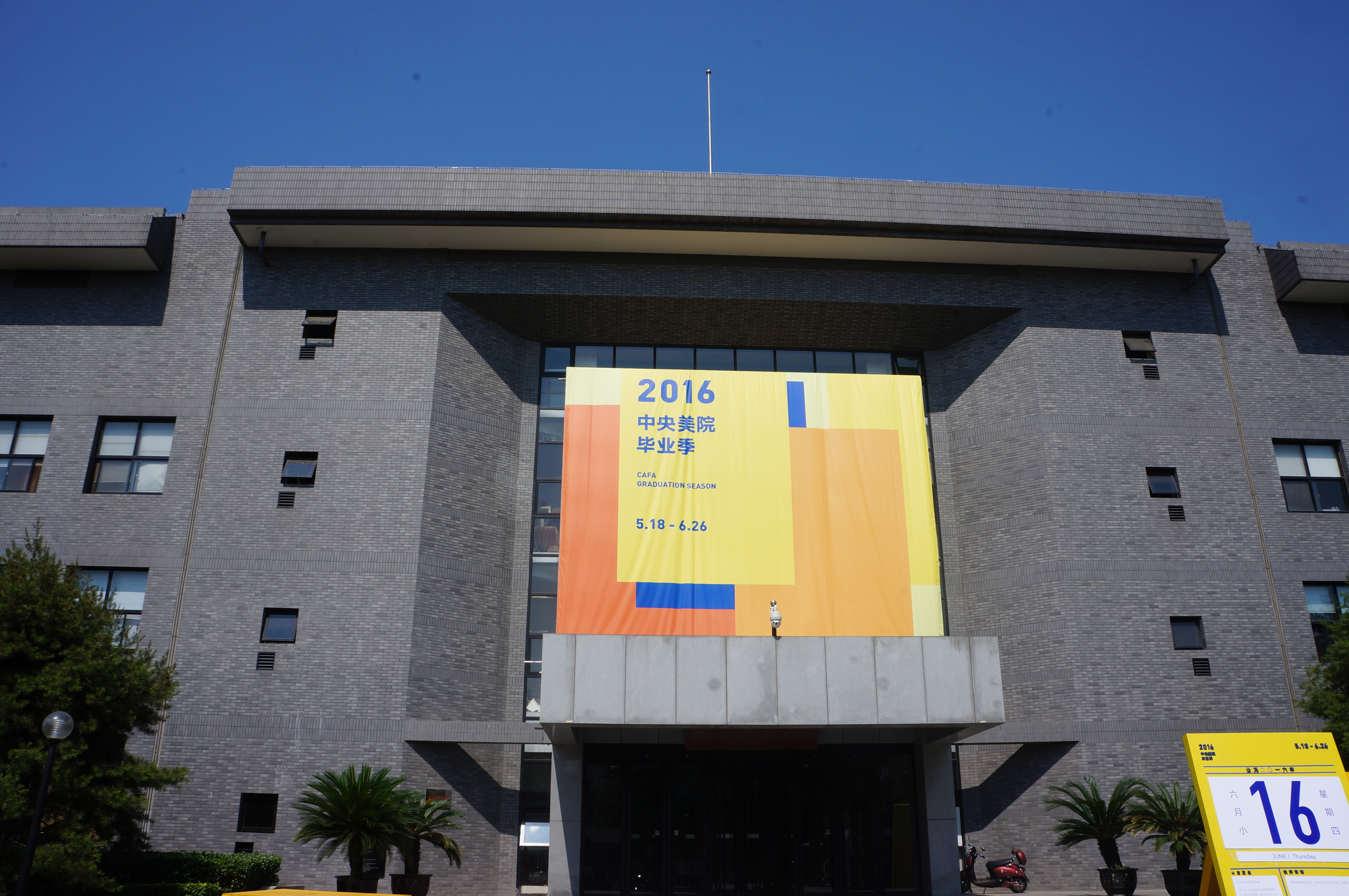
2016 graduation exhibition

=== Faculty of Art and Design ===
- School of Chinese Painting
- School of Fine Art
  - Department of Oil Painting
  - Department of Printmaking
  - Department of Sculpture
  - Department of Mural Painting
- School of Experimental Art
- School of Humanities
  - Department of Art History and Theory
  - Department of Cultural Heritage
  - Non-material Cultural Heritage Research Center
  - Information Center
- School of Design
  - Visual Communication
  - Industrial Design
  - Digital Media Design
  - Photography
  - Fashion Design
  - Jewelry Design
- School of Architecture
  - Architecture
  - Landscape Design
  - Interior Design
- College of City Design
  - Department of Information Design
    - Publishing Design
    - Communication Design
    - Commercial Information Design
  - Department of Product Design
    - Ceramic Design
    - Artwork Design
    - Interior Product Design
    - Jewelry Design
  - Department of Space Design
    - Public Art
    - Exhibition Design
    - Visual System Design
  - Department of Video Design
    - Animation
    - Game Design
    - Experimental Movie
- School of Arts Administration and Education

=== Graduate school ===
- Master's Degree Course
- Doctoral Degree Course

== Museum of CAFA ==
Set up in the early 1960s, the Museum of Central Academy of Fine Arts (formerly CAFA Gallery), has a collection of 13,000 works which cover a wide variety of genres and styles, including representative works by ancient and modern Chinese masters as well as fine student works. Since the incorporation of the foundation of the Academy in 1950 it has contained Chinese painting, oil painting, print, sculpture and folk art such as New Year picture, embroidery and minority ethnic costume and objects, along with Chinese relics of bronze, pottery, engravings and rubbings.

== Rankings and reputation ==
It has been consistently ranked the best in China among universities specialized in Arts in the recognized Best Chinese Universities Ranking.

As of 2023, the university was ranked 15th globally for "art and design" in the QS World University Rankings.

== Notable alumni ==
- Beohar Rammanohar Sinha
- Chen Man
- Fang Lijun
- He Chengyao
- Hou Hanru
- Hung Liu
- Jiang Shuo
- Jin Shangyi
- Old Xian
- Sui Jianguo
- Wang Chunchen
- Wu Guanzhong
- Wu Shaoxiang
- Wu Zuoren
- Xu Bing
- Yan Cong
- Yu Chen
- Yu Xingze
- Zhang Huan
- Yan Ping
- Ge Yulu

== See also ==
- Chinese fine art
