= Seven Gao =

Seven Gao 高娅媛
- Born: Gao Yayuan; January 1, 1982 (age 43); Shanghai, China
- Genres: Pop
- Occupation: Singer
- Years active: 2006–present
- Labels: Universal Music

Seven Gao, whose Chinese name is Gao Yayuan (高娅媛), was born in Shanghai in 1982. She attended the talent show called “My Show” hosted by Dongfang TV in 2006. She stood out for her handsome appearance and special voice and ranked fourth in the competition. She is very popular now in the mainland of China, especially among young generations. Her fans are called Niangao.

== Awards ==
- 2006: Came fourth in the talent show “My Show”
- 2006: The First Network Entertainment Festival—The spark music award for freshmen.
- 2007: The First New Entertainment Charity Party—The most compassionate freshman award.
- 2007: The Night of Luo Lai—The First Top List of Fashion Presentation Ceremony—The annual top ten fashion idols award.
- 2009: The 16th Top List of East—The best freshman award.

== Album ==
Break-up Diary (Launched on 11.11.2008 by Universal Music)
