= China Guardian =

Chinese auction company

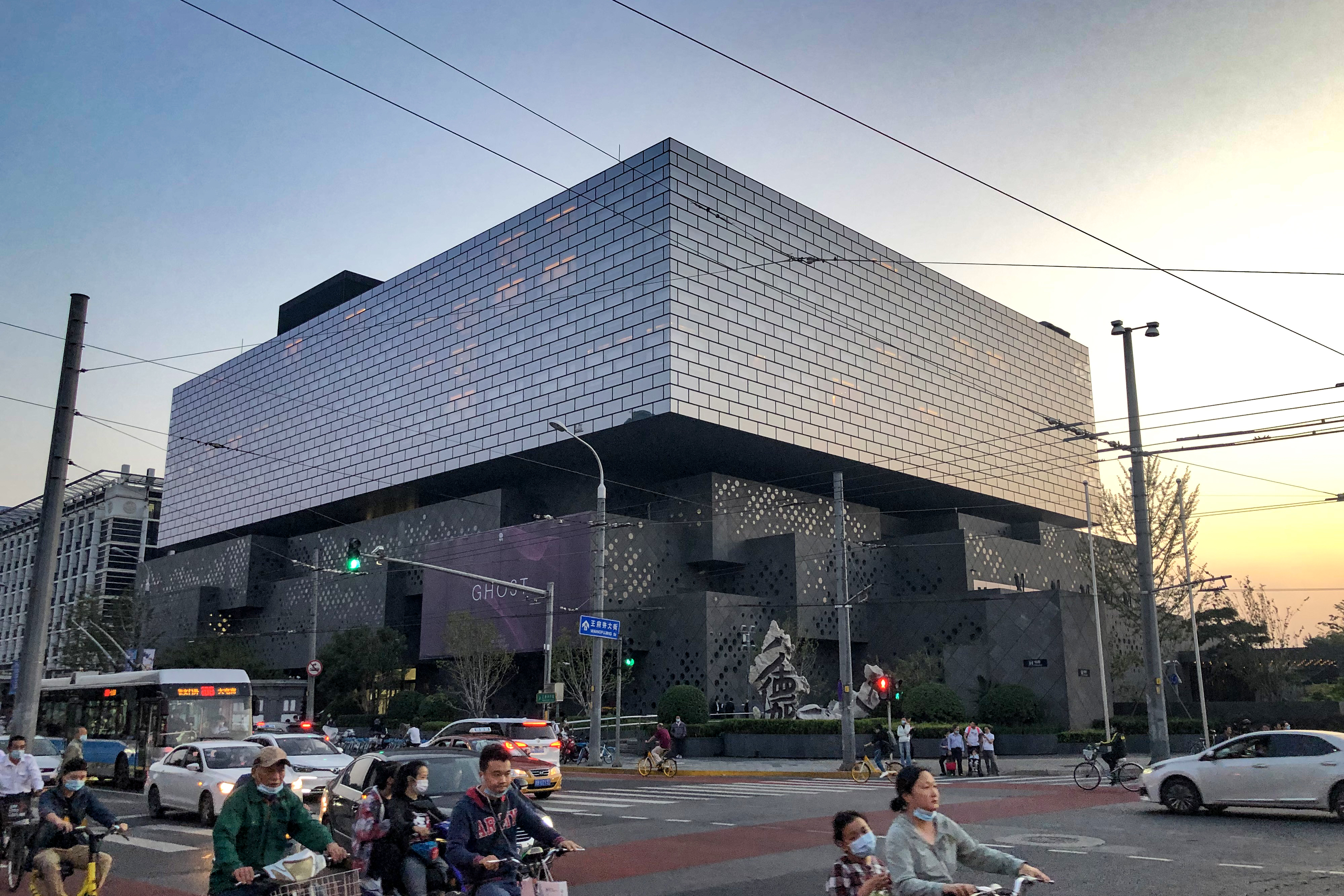
- Guardian Art Center, headquarters of China Guardian in Beijing
- Native name: 中国嘉德国际拍卖有限公司
- Industry: Auction house
- Founded: May 1993 in Beijing, China

China Guardian Auctions Co. Ltd., or simply China Guardian (Chinese: 中国嘉德), is a mainland Chinese auction house that specialises in the auction of Chinese artwork of all types. It is particularly known for its sale of Chinese calligraphy and ink paintings.

First founded in May 1993 by Chen Dongsheng, China Guardian is China's oldest art-auction firm. China Guardian was a leader of the Chinese art auction market until the emergence of Beijing Poly International Auction Co Ltd in the mid-2000s. China Guardian is now considered to be mainland China's 'number 2 auctioneer' behind Beijing Poly International Auction. The auction house was also reported to be the world's 4th largest auction house as at November 2012. The current CEO and managing director is Hu Yanyan, who was included in a 2015 Financial Times list as one of the five most powerful women in Asia's art world.

Aside from its headquarters in Beijing and offices in Shanghai and Guangzhou, China Guardian also has offices in Hong Kong, Taiwan, Japan and North America (New York and Canada).

== Formation, structure and target market ==
When China Guardian was first established in 1993, it focused primarily on the mainland Chinese market until it decided to expand to Hong Kong in 2012. The Chinese artwork regularly sold by China Guardian includes Chinese paintings, calligraphy, porcelain, furniture, sculptures, rare books, rubbings, jewellery and watches. Approximately 60% of China Guardian's sales are in the categories of ink painting and calligraphy. China Guardian insists that it does not purchase and resell art works; instead China Guardian generates its revenue solely from commission fees on transactions. As of July 2016, China Guardian owns a 24% stake in Taiking Life Insurance Co. Taiking Life Insurance Co, in turn, owns a 13.5% stake in the British auction house Sotheby's. Taiking Life Insurance Co and China Guardian were both founded by Chen Dongsheng. In the 23 years of operation up to December 2016, China Guardian has successfully held more than 1,200 auctions, with a total sales volume of nearly 50 billion yuan. Nearly 450,000 items were sold at the China Guardian's auctions.

== Notable auctions ==
The Qianlong edition of Lanting Tu in silks and gold thread sold at the 2004 Spring Auctions for 35.75 million yuan (US$5.14 million).

Vase painted with patterns of eight immortals crossing the sea made from period of Qianlong Emperor of Qing dynasty sold at the 2006 Spring Auctions for 35.75 million yuan (US$5.14 million).

Ping'an Tie by the ancient Chinese calligrapher Wang Xizhi sold at the 2010 Autumn Auctions, transaction price: 308 million yuan (US$46.60 million).

Ming dynasty framed bed made in Huanghuali wood with six horseshoe legs and cloud clusters patterns sold at the 2010 Autumn Auctions for transaction price 43.12 million yuan (US$6.21 million).

Fuxi-style Chinese zither from Tang dynasty sold at the 2011 Spring Auctions for 115 million yuan (US$16.55 million).

Qi Baishi's Pine and Cypress sold at the 2011 Spring Auctions for transaction price for 425.5 million yuan (US$61.23 million).

In October 2012, Album of Mountains and Rivers by Qi Baishi sold for almost US$6 million in China Guardian's Hong Kong auction.

Jin Shangyi's Tajik Bride sold at the 2013 Autumn Auctions for 85.1 million yuan (US$12.25 million).

China Guardian's 2015 Spring Auction sold US$301.2 million worth of art. In the same year, Pan Tianshou's Eagle, Rock and Flora sold for US$43 million, while Thousands of Mountains in Autumn by Li Keran sold for US$28.4 million.

In May 2016, an 11th-century 124-character letter signed and written by Chinese scholar Zeng Gong was sold for 207 million yuan (£22 million or US$32 million) at China Guardian's Beijing auction. This letter set a new record price for a work of Chinese calligraphy, with its price having doubled since the letter's second sale in 2009 where it sold for 108 million yuan. The letter was first sold at Christie's in New York for 4.51 million yuan (or US$508,500) in or about 1996.

Chinese painter Zhang Daqian's water colour and ink painting A Landscape of Mountains was sold for US$15.2 million in November 2016.
