= Jin Shangyi =

Chinese painter (1934 - )

- 靳尚谊
- Born: 1934 (age 91–92); He Nan
- Known for: Figurative Art

Jin Shangyi (born 1934) is a contemporary Chinese oil painter within the neoclassical realism movement in Chinese oil painting. From 1987 to 2001, Jin Shangyi served as president of the Central Academy of Fine Arts and professor of the Oil Painting Department.

== Art works ==
Jin Shangyi's paintings have been permanently collected by the National Art Museum of China among others.

In 2013, Jin Shangyi's painting Tajik Bride was sold for 85.1 million yuan ($13.97 million) at the 2013 Autumn Auctions at China Guardian Beijing.
