= Lydia Li =

- Born: Shanghai, China
- Musical career
- Origin: Hong Kong
- Instrument: Piano

Lydia Li, born in Shanghai, China, was a TV presenter and actress in the 1990s. Raised in Hong Kong and Shanghai, she is fluent in English, Cantonese, Mandarin and her native Shanghainese dialect.

She plays the piano and published her piano compositions on YouTube and Youku Tudou. Lydia is also a public relations expert and entrepreneur.

Lydia is appointed as the Image Ambassador of "Power of Art 2024 World Contemporary Artists Australian Parliament Invitational Exhibition".

== Early life ==
When she was studying in the Girls' School in 1987, she participated in the English Programme TV presenter Competition held by Shanghai Television (上海电视台). Amongst thousands of contestants, she finally won the competition as the youngest Television host for English Television Programme. She hosted Five Minute English which was the first English Television Programme series produced by Shanghai Television. She was also the TV hostess of children programmes, music shows etc. She was raised in a musical family and learned piano at age of 5. She played at multiple events. She was a famous commercial model in Shanghai during 1988–1990.
