= Chen Qi (collector) =

Chinese modern collector (1912–2000)

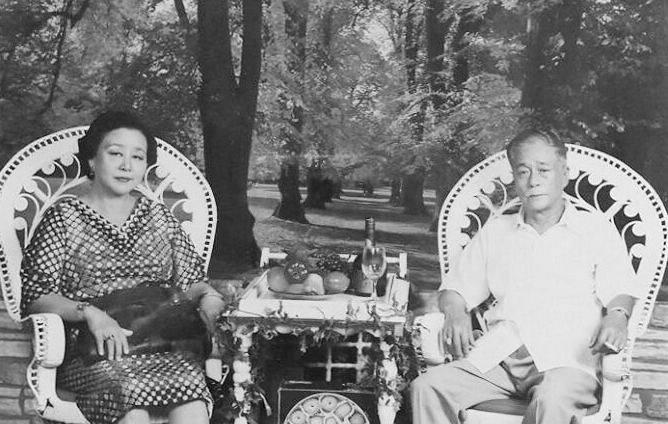
- Chen Qi with his wife, Qiuben Jiumeizi
- Born: 8 March 1912; Fujian, China
- Died: 2000
- Occupation(s): Art and antiquities collector
- Known for: Collecting art and antiquities
- Spouse: Qiuben Jiumeizi (Lin Yachun)

Chen Qi (陳淇; 8 March 1912 – 2000), who styled himself as "Cangquan" (滄泉）and "Yuquanshanren"（玉泉山人), was a Chinese modern-day collector of art and antiquities.

Chen Qi was born in Fujian on 8 March 1912, in a merchant family. He was well educated in the traditional culture. Under the tutelage of his grandfather, Chen Qi studied texts such as "Three Character Classic", "Thousand Poems", "Book of Filial Piety", and Confucian classics. He also studied Tang Kai (one of the Chinese traditional calligraphy scripts originated from the Tang dynasty) as daily calligraphy class.

In 1932, Chen Qi went to Japan and was enrolled in the famous Imperial Japanese Army Academy, a military school founded in 1868. Imperial Japanese Army Academy was committed to Militaristic Spiritual Education and had successfully trained a large number of senior generals, who participated in the Second Sino-Japanese War later on. Many famous modern Chinese generals also graduated from Imperial Japanese Army Academy, such as Cai E, Ying Heqin, Li Rujiong, Tang Enbo, etc.

When Chen Qi was in Japan, he met his wife, Qiuben Jiumeizi, who moved to China and changed her name to Lin Yachun. While in Japan, Chen Qi also got to know Chinese painter, Fu Baoshi. He was holding his the first exhibition in the country at the time. Since both men were staying in the foreign country, they became friends right away. In June 1935, Fu Baoshi went back to China due to his mother's serious illness. Two months later, Chen Qi returned to China as well and was invited by Fu Baoshi to visit Nanchang, where Fu held his first personal exhibition in China. Chen Qi died in 2000.
