= Büdelsdorf =

- Town
- Coat of arms

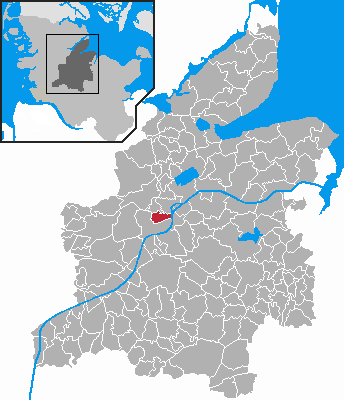
- Location of Büdelsdorf within Rendsburg-Eckernförde district
- Interactive map of Büdelsdorf
- Location within Germany Location within Schleswig-Holstein
- Coordinates: 54°19′N 9°41′E
- Country: Germany
- State: Schleswig-Holstein
- District: Rendsburg-Eckernförde

Government
  - Mayor: Jürgen Hein

Area
  - Total: 6.48 km^{2} (2.50 sq mi)
- Elevation: 9 m (30 ft)

Population (2025-12-31)
  - Total: 10,371
  - Density: 1,600/km^{2} (4,150/sq mi)
- Time zone: UTC+01:00 (CET)
  - Summer (DST): UTC+02:00 (CEST)
- Postal codes: 24782
- Dialling codes: 04331
- Vehicle registration: RD
- Website: www.buedelsdorf.de

Büdelsdorf (German pronunciation: [ˈbyːdl̩sˌdɔʁf]; Danish: Bydelstorp; Low German: Büdelsdörp) is a town in the district of Rendsburg-Eckernförde, in Schleswig-Holstein, Germany. It is situated on the river Eider and the Kiel Canal, approx. 2 kilometres (1 mile) north of Rendsburg, and 30 km (19 mi) west of Kiel, just 5 mi (8 km) off the motorway.

== History ==
The earliest inhabitants of the area which later became Büdelsdorf, were Stone-Age people who lived there around 3000 BC. Modern Büdelsdorf originates from a small settlement attached to Rendsburg around 1300 AD.

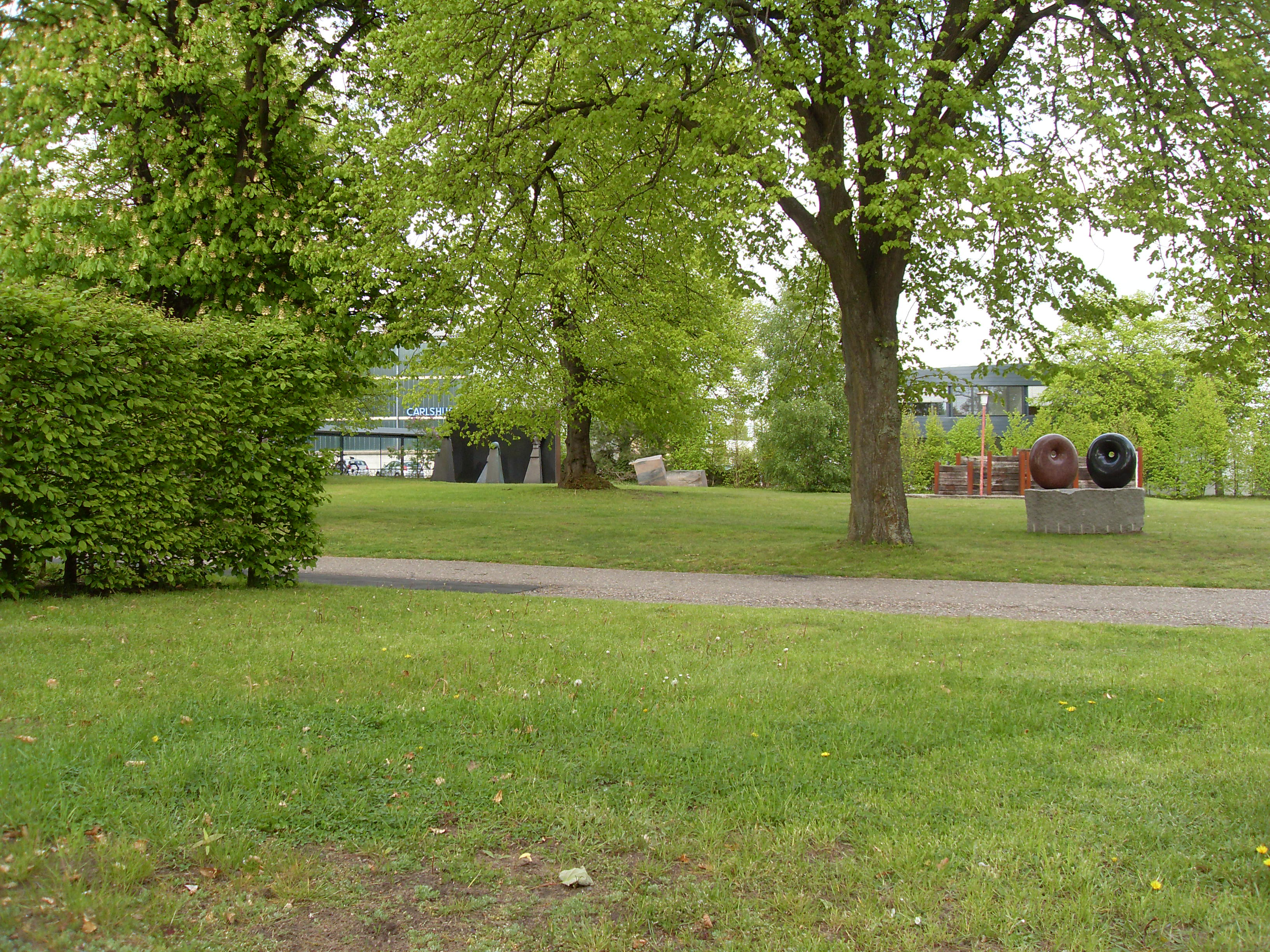
Carlshütte (2010), art and cultural center Kunst in der Carlshütte (KiC) with sculpture park attached to it

In 1777, work on the Eider Canal linking the Baltic Sea to the North Sea began. In 1779, the boundaries of village were defined. In 1827, Hartwig Marcus Holler opened the Carlshütte, the first industrial-age iron- and steelworks in the duchy. Holler also built a shipyard and created jobs for the factory workers' wives. In 1841, he employed more than 250 workers. In 1895, the Kiel Canal was finished and Büdelsdorf and the Carlshütte flourished. In 1909, the Carlshütte employed 1,100 workers.

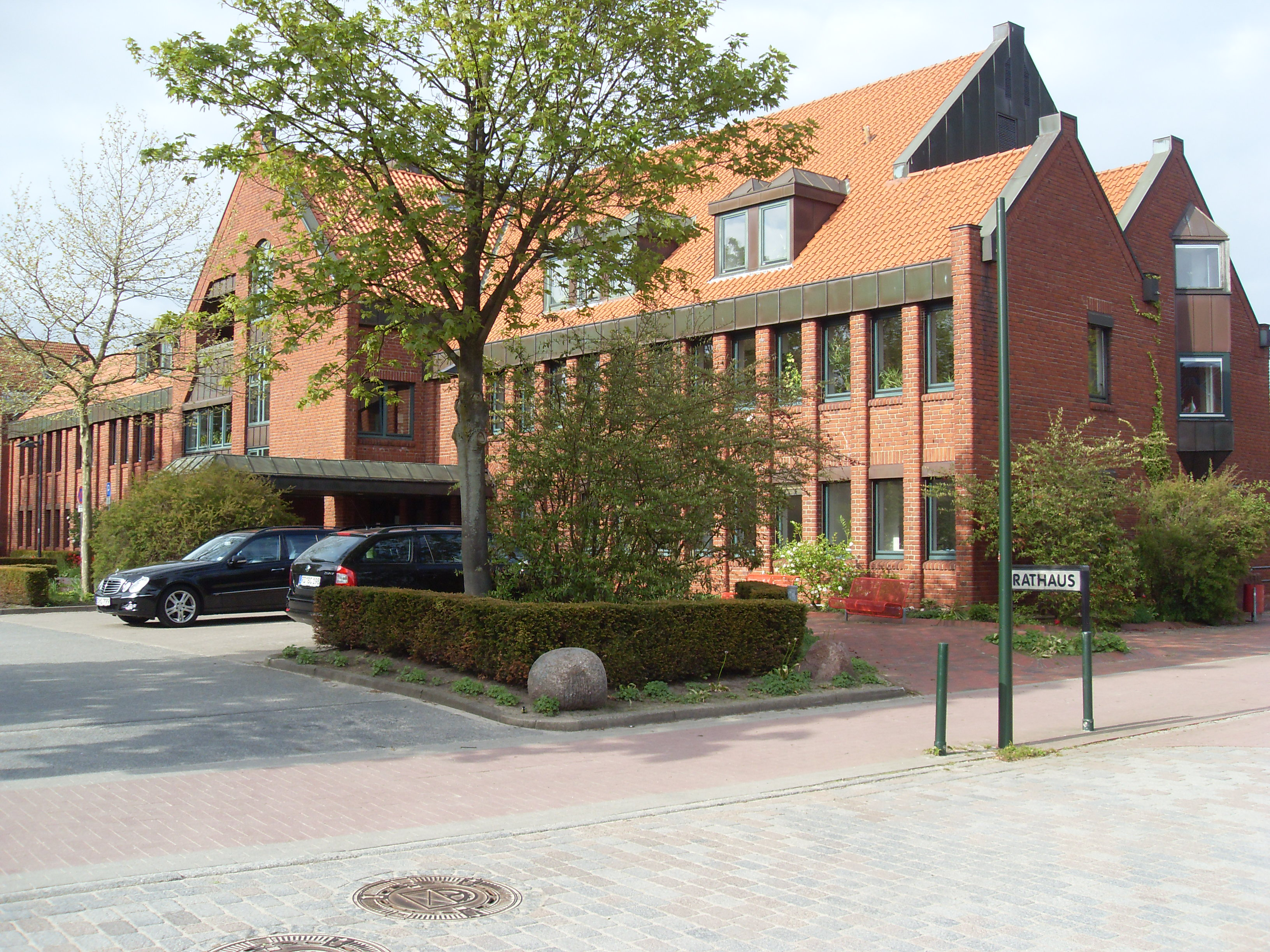
Büdelsdorf town hall (2010)

Development slowed with World War I. However, Büdelsdorf grew to be a borough with about 10,000 inhabitants throughout the 20th century. In 1984, Büdelsdorf's new town center was opened, consisting of a new town hall, a community centre and several blocks of flats and shops. In 1988, Büdelsdorf acquired vast areas of land and managed to attract several companies. As a result, Büdelsdorf is a thriving community with about 11,000 inhabitants and 5,000 jobs.

In 2000, Büdelsdorf was granted the title of town, opening new opportunities for its future development. Herbert Schütt, long-term mayor of Büdelsdorf, was the first mayor of the town of Büdelsdorf.

== Sons and daughters of the city ==
- Max Steen (1898–1997), teacher and local researcher
- Edward Hoop (1925–2008), historian and criminal investigator
- Michael Koglin (born 1955), journalist and writer

== Persons associated with Büdelsdorf ==
- Elisabeth Haseloff (1914–1974), Evangelical Lutheran pastor
- Rainer Korff (born 1955), General of the Bundeswehr
- Gerhard Delling (born 1959), sports journalist

== International relations ==
=== Twin towns – Sister cities ===
Büdelsdorf is twinned with:

- Aalborg, Denmark
