= Rong Bao Zhai =

Auction house and fine art shop in Beijing

Coordinates: 39.89417°N 116.37727°E

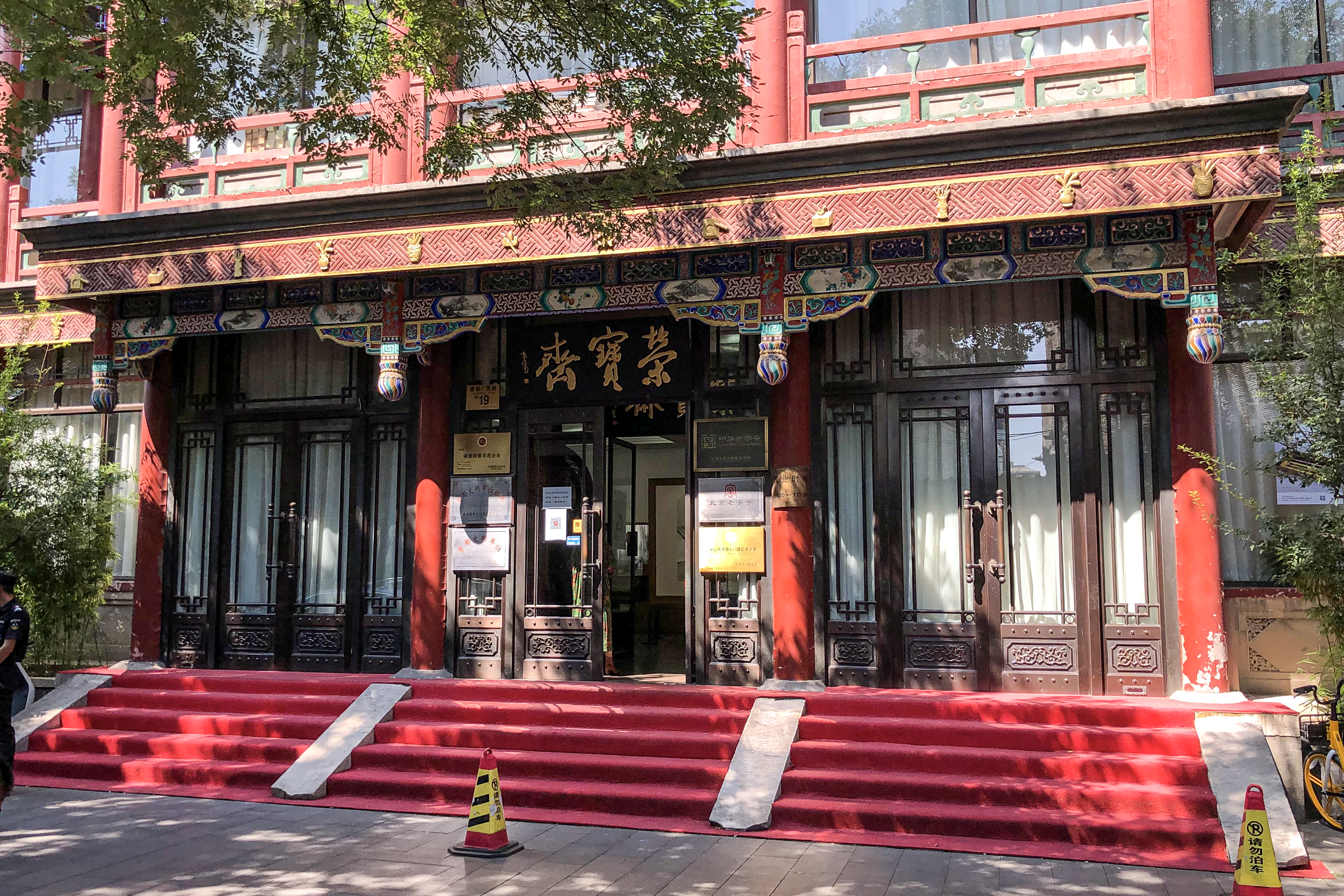
- Native name: 荣宝斋
- Industry: Stationery
- Founded: 1672
- Headquarters: 19 Liulichang Xijie, Xuanwu District, Beijing, China
- Website: www.rongbaozhai.cn

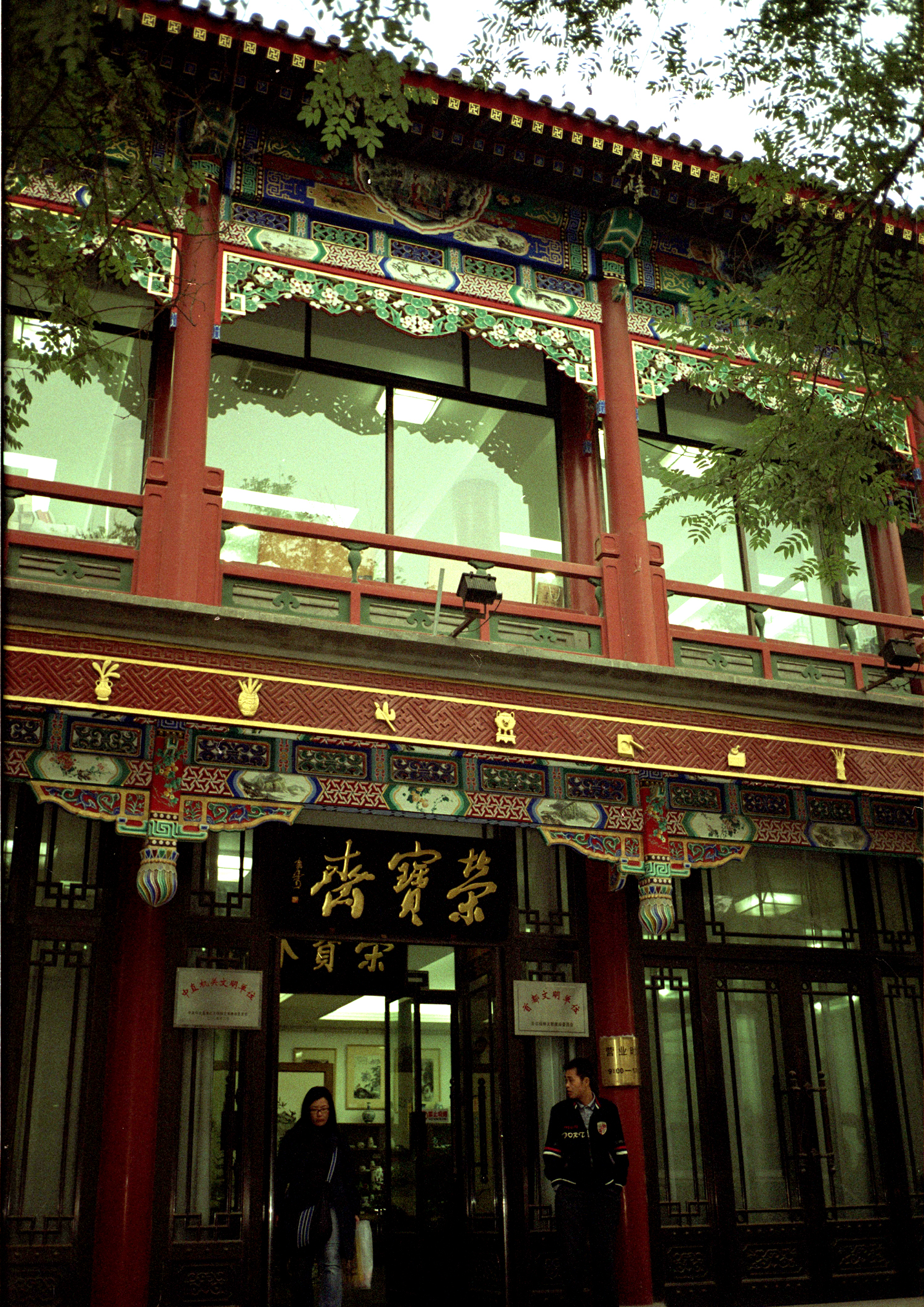
Rongbaozhai

Rong Bao Zhai (simplified Chinese: 荣宝斋; traditional Chinese: 榮寶齋, Studio of Glorious Treasures) is an old stationery, calligraphy and painting shop in Beijing, China. It is located in Liulichang outside the Hepingmen Gate.

== History ==
Rong Bao Zhai was founded in 1672 (11th year of the Kangxi reign in the Qing dynasty) as the Song Zhu Zhai (松竹斋; Pine and Bamboo Studio), and adopted its current name in 1894.

In mainland China, Rong Bao Zhai was recognized as the "Chinese Time-honored" enterprises by the Ministry of Commerce of the People's Republic of China.

== See also ==
- List of oldest companies
