= Chen Yu (information scientist) =

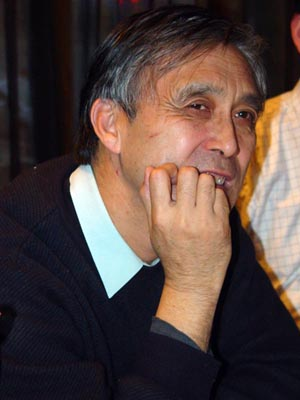
- Born: 陈禹; March 18, 1944 (age 82); Wuxi, China
- Education: Renmin University of China
- Occupation: Professor of Renmin University of China
- Known for: Chinese information scientist

Chen Yu (simplified Chinese: 陈禹; traditional Chinese: 陳禹; pinyin: Chén Yǔ; born 18 March 1944) is a Chinese information scientist and information economist.

== Biographical sketch ==
Chen Yu was born in Wuxi, China, on March 18, 1944. He is now professor of Information School, Renmin University of China. He is notable for his academic achievements in information science and information economics. His major research fields include computer applications, information management, systems science and information economics. He has been the adviser of about 30 doctoral candidates during 1995-2009.

== Education ==
- 1981: Graduated from Renmin University of China, with master's degree in Management
- 1965: Graduated from Beijing Normal College, with bachelor's degree in Mathematics

== Positions ==
=== Present Positions ===
- Professor, Information School, Renmin University of China
- Director, China Information Economics Society
- Member, National e-Government Standardization General Group
- Director, Laboratory for Economical Sciences, Renmin University of China
- Informatization Consultant, Beijing Municipal Government
- Member (1988- ), IFIP WG 8.1
- Member (1999- ), IFIP TC 8
- Member, Association for Computing Machinery
- Member, IEEE

=== Former Positions ===
- Dean, Information School, Renmin University of China
- Director, Information Center, Renmin University of China
- Director, Network Center, Renmin University of China

== Major works (Chinese titles translated into English) ==
- A course for information management engineers (2006)
- An introduction to information science and methodology (2006)
- Analysis and design of information systems (2005)
- An introduction to information management and information systems (2005)
- Digitizing enterprises (2003)
- Basic knowledge in the information age (2000)
- Software development tools (2000)
- A course of information economics (1998)
- Measurement theory and methodology for knowledge economy (1998)
- Practical handbook of office automation (1997)
- An introduction to economic information management (1996)
- Dialogues about systems: phenomena, inspirations and discussions (1989)
