= Jiang Shuo =

Chinese sculptor (born 1958)

- Born: 蔣朔; 1958 (age 66–67); Beijing
- Education: Central Academy of Fine Arts
- Known for: Sculptor

Jiang Shuo (Chinese: 蔣朔; pinyin: Jiáng Shuò; born 1958 in Beijing, China) is a Chinese contemporary sculptor.

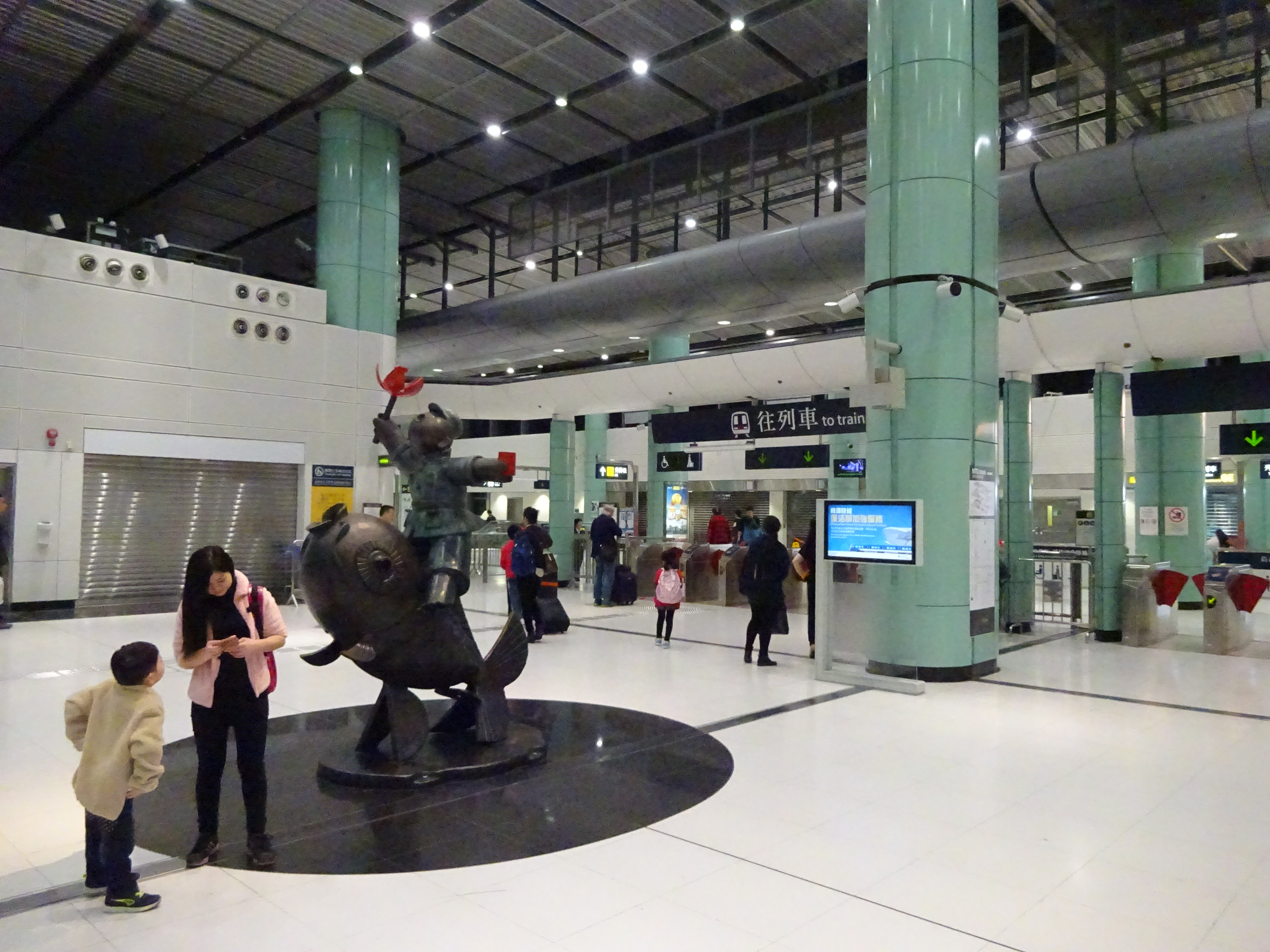
Bauhinia Rider, Departure Concourse, MTR Lok Ma Chau Station, Hong Kong, 2010

== Biography ==
Jiang Shuo was born in 1958 in Beijing, China. She studied sculpture at the Central Academy of Arts and Design, now the Academy of Fine Arts, Tsinghua University, Beijing, from 1978–1982, and was one of the few women to do so. She studied under the sculptor Professor Zheng Ke for three years, becoming the first woman sculptor in China to complete a post-graduate degree. Jiang then became a lecturer at the school from 1986–1989. In 1989, she immigrated to Austria with her sculptor husband, Wu Shaoxiang and their three-year-old son. They settled in Klagenfurt, Carinthia where they established a joint studio. In 2006, he set up a studio in Beijing. Due to her increasing popularity, 2012 saw the opening of a studio in Berlin. Since then Jiang has widely exhibited her sculptures around the world, including Austria, Indonesia, Singapore, and Switzerland. Her works are also regularly sold through galleries, and at auctions in Beijing, Hong Kong, Austria, and New York. Many of her works are included in major private and museum collections as well. Alternating Wu Shaoxiang lives today in Austria, Berlin and Beijing.

== Early works ==
Jiang's earlier works in bronze possess a folk-like quality. These achieved recognition in China before she left for Austria in 1989. Such sculptures hint at blissful childhood memories of innocent children enjoying themselves in sport, playing music, and returning their mothers' warm embrace – which suggest Jiang's strong family values.

== Later works ==
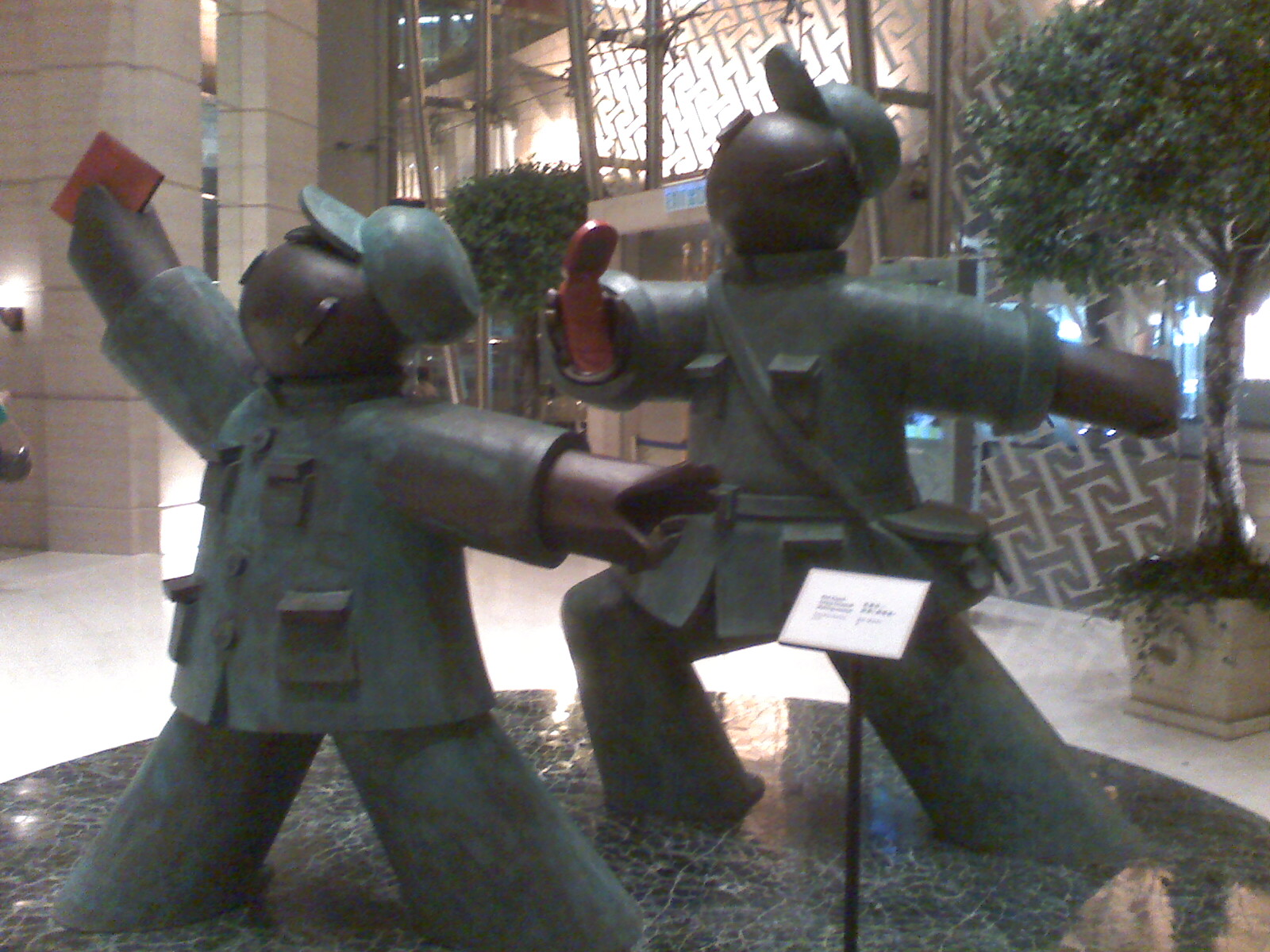
Red Guards - Going Forward! Making Money!, a 2004 sculpture by Jiang Shuo, exhibited in the lobby of Langham Place Hotel, in Hong Kong.

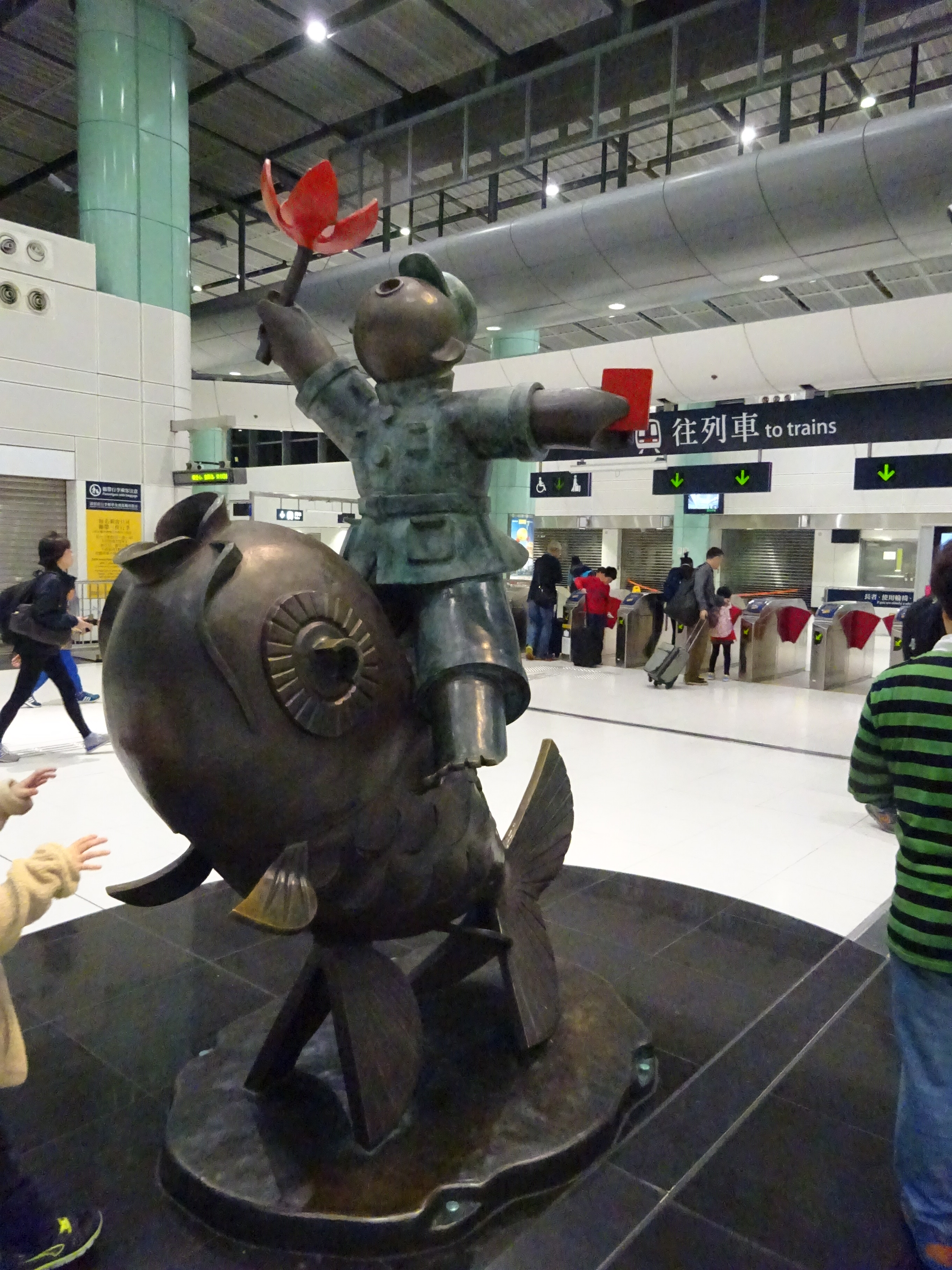
Bauhinia Rider, Departure Concourse, MTR Lok Ma Chau Station, Hong Kong, 2010

However, Jiang became famous with her iconic "Red Guard" series begun in 2003. These anonymous, open-mouthed warriors who wear the Red Guard uniform, are cast in the ancient lost wax technique. They carry either a red flag or The Little Red Book, and reflect both her personal experience as a young Red Guard during the Cultural Revolution, and her observations from abroad of China's emergence into a capitalistic machine.

In 1993, after her family gained Austrian citizenship, Jiang returned to China and witnessed first-hand the changes that were occurring, and the ironic situation that was taking place; the Red Guards who previously persecuted the "bourgeois" elements of society had now become the successful businessmen or capitalists driving China's burgeoning economy.

As Jiang's work progressed her Red Guard figures, for example, Cloud Rider - Terracotta Red (2008), and Run 2 (2006), began posing alongside material items that replaced The Little Red Book. They now sang karaoke, drank Coca-Cola, ate McDonald's, and rode atop flashy automobiles – all reflective of the lifestyles of rich businessmen pursuing a life filled with commercial luxury.

== See also ==
- Wu Shaoxiang
- Cultural Revolution
- Red Guards
