= Beijing Hanhai =

Auction house in Beijing, China

- Native name: 北京翰海
- Industry: Art, auctions
- Founded: 1994; 32 years ago
- Headquarters: 80 Liulichang East Street, Beijing, China
- Area served: China
- Website: hanhai.net

Beijing Hanhai (Chinese: 北京翰海; pinyin: Běijīng Hànhǎi), officially the Beijing Hanhai Auction Co., Ltd, is an auction house located in Beijing. Established in 1994, after the Chinese government began allowing the auction of relics, it grew under the management of Qin Gong to become one of the country's largest auction houses by 2003. In 2011, it became the world's seventh-largest art auctioneer by reported sales, though it has since been surpassed. The company has sold paintings, calligraphic works, and pottery, as well as Buddha statues. Notable sales have included Zhang Xian's Pictures of Ten Poems (approx. US$2 million, 1996) and Xu Beihong's Ba People Fetching Water (¥171 million, or US$24,800,000, 2011).

== History ==
=== Background ===
Although international auction houses such as Christie's and Sotheby's have operated in Hong Kong, the first art auction in mainland China occurred in 1992. Previously impossible under laws protecting cultural relics, the Beijing International Auction was sponsored by the Beijing Municipal Cultural Relics Bureau and spearheaded by the Hong Kong–based collector Robert Chang. Subsequently, Zhu Junbo (祝君波) of the Shanghai-based art dealer Duo Yun Xuan organized an auction at the Hilton Hotel, Shanghai, recording transactions of ¥8.35 million (US$1,210,000) and a commission of ¥2 million (US$300,000); this was twice the company's income in the preceding year.

With the success of these auctions, several auction houses were established. China Guardian was established at the Great Wall Hotel in Beijing, opening on 18 May 1993 and holding its first auction on 27 March 1994. The art collector Mi Jinyang (米景扬), having attended the Duo Yun Xuan auction, established the Beijing Rongbao auction house. Beijing Hanhai was established in January 1994, with Qin Gong (秦公) of the Beijing Cultural Relics Store as its general manager. Previously having attempted to improve sluggish sales by holding exhibitions domestically and in Japan, Singapore, Hong Kong, and Macau, Qin recognized the economic potential of auctions and received approval from Vice Mayor Zhang Baifa after petitioning Mayor Chen Xitong via a friend. Hanhai is headquartered on East Liulichang in Xicheng District, Beijing, and was originally known as the Beijing Hanhai Art Auction Co.

=== Under Qin Gong ===
Hanhai held its first auction over 18–19 September 1994 at Poly Theater, with Qin seeking the assistance of Robert Chang in preparations. The auction was scheduled for a period when neither Christie's nor Sotheby's were holding auctions, and representatives from both international houses were invited. A total of 460 items were listed under the categories "Chinese Paintings and Calligraphy" and "Chinese Antiques and Curiosities". Of these, 349 were sold, with total sales worth ¥33 million (US$4,800,000). By 1996, Hanhai was one of nine auction houses operating out of Beijing; these reported combined sales of US$60 million, with the art market having grown sevenfold in two years as the Chinese economy saw extensive growth.

During its Spring 1996 auction, Hanhai listed 1,057 artworks. Over the course of three days, the house sold art worth ¥94 million (US$14,000,000). Hanhai reported several major sales, including a painting attributed to the Song-era poet Zhang Xian sold to the Palace Museum for more than US$2 million. (Note: Amounts reported include US$2.1 million (Buchanan 1996), US$2.2 million (St. Louis Post 1995), and US$2.5 million (Melikian 1996)) Titled Pictures of Ten Poems, the work had been held by the Qing dynasty in its imperial collection and taken by Emperor Pu Yi when he abdicated in 1912, then lost during the Second World War. (Note: According to the art historian Zhao Yu, as of 2014 Beijing Hanhai has sold 21 items taken by Puyi during his abdication (Zhao 2014)) According to Hanhai, other works have been acquired by the National Museum of China, the Beijing Library, the Beijing Capital Museum, and the China Printing Museum, as well as numerous corporate museums.

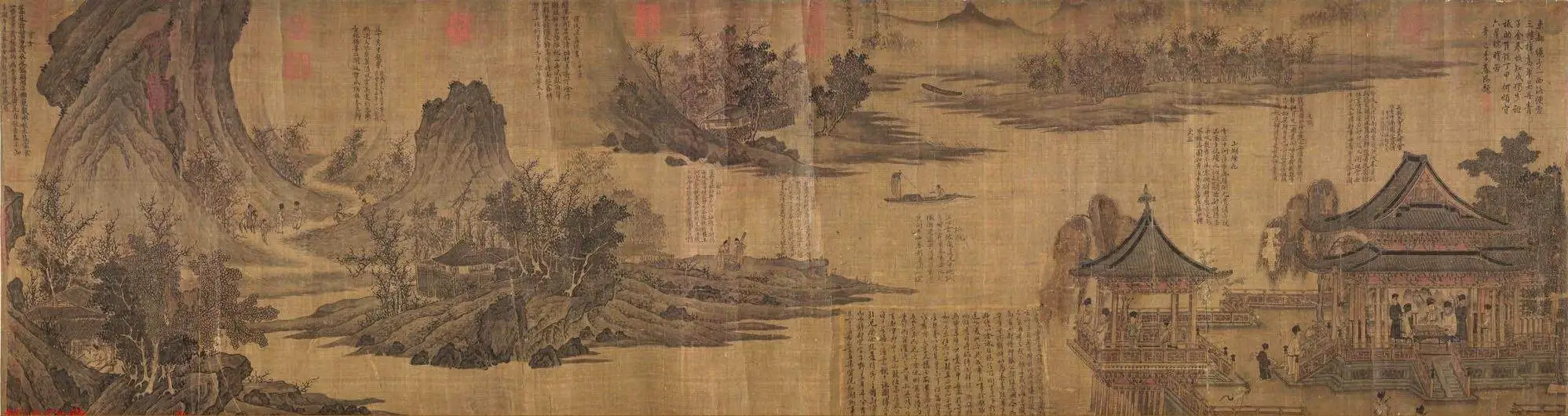
Zhang Xian's Pictures of Ten Poems, sold by Hanhai to the Palace Museum

=== Subsequent auctions ===
Qin died in 2000, with the Spring 2000 auction the last for which he had selected items; total sales were reported at ¥88 million (US$13,000,000). By the early 2000s, as the Chinese government was returning works confiscated during the Cultural Revolution, Hanhai was one of the auction houses selling repatriated works. One, a piece of calligraphy attributed to Huaisu that was seized from the Ding family of Qingdao, was listed at ¥10,000,000 (US$1,000,000) in 2001. By this point, Hanhai's annual revenues had increased to ¥200,000,000 (US$30,000,000), amidst a rapidly expanding domestic art market that was driven partly by a liberalized legal framework and partly by the repatriation of Chinese art from abroad. (Note: According to Nailene Chou of the South China Morning Post, after the China Poly Group acquired three of the Old Summer Palace bronze heads at a Hong Kong auction in 2000, mainland Chinese buyers – including auction houses seeking to maintain their stock – began to acquire works held abroad at a premium (Chou 2004). During this period, museums had difficulty keeping pace, and thus acquisitions via auction became less common (Mazurkewich 2001a).) In 2003, Hanhai was one of China's largest auction houses, a title it shared with China Guardian.

At the Spring 2002 auction, which featured 2,158 items, Hanhai sold a painting of two birds in a pond of lotuses by Bada Shanren for ¥5,170,000 (US$748,000). The sale of this work, formerly owned by a foreign collector, was a record price for a work of Chinese art. Another work, Mountain and Water, was sold for ¥2,300,000 (US$330,000). Other major sales in the mid-2000s included Lu Yanshao's Du Fu's Poems in a Hundred Leaves (杜甫诗意百开册页, sold for ¥69.3 million [US$10,000,000] in 2004) and Xu Beihong's The Foolish Old Man Removes the Mountains (愚公移山), sold for ¥33 million [US$4,800,000] in 2006). (Note: Based on a folktale, this work was completed in 1939 during Xu Beihong's time in Singapore and hidden in a well for ten years (Wang 2006).) In 2007, a dragon-pattern vase from the reign of the Yongzheng Emperor sold for ¥15.7 million (US$2,270,000), 26 times the asking price; bidders suggested that the work may have come from the Old Summer Palace. Hanhai's Autumn 2009 auction, held at the Kerry Center Hotel, included the sale of Qi Baishi's Flowers and Insects for ¥16.8 million (US$2,430,000), a record for the artist, though overall sales suffered as a result of the Great Recession.

In 2010, Hanhai auctioned Xu Beihong's painting Ba People Fetching Water (巴人汲水图) for ¥171 million (US$24,800,000); at the time, this was the highest price ever achieved for a Chinese painting. (Note: This painting had been sold at Hanhai twice previously, in 1999 for ¥1,200,000 (US$170,000) and in 2004 for ¥16,500,000 (US$2,390,000). The magazine Art 99 notes that this was a 130-fold increase in value over eleven years (Art 99 2014).) The house reported sales of ¥2.456 billion (US$355,500,000), representing 2,653 works, in its Spring 2011 Auction. This decreased to ¥540 million (US$78,000,000) in the Autumn 2012 auction, which featured works by Ma Jin and Li Keran, each selling for more than ¥10 million, as well as more than 130 Buddha statues. Between 3 and 8 December 2013, Hanhai hosted its Autumn 2013 Auction at the Crowne Plaza Hotel, having previously held an exhibition at the Ritz-Carlton Hotel on 16–17 November. This auction was held as part of the Dashilai-Liulichang Shopping Festival. The downturn in sales continued through 2014.

Hanhai has held multiple special auctions. In November 2009, to commemorate the 60th anniversary of the founding of the People's Republic of China, it held an auction dedicated to "Red Art"; one work, by Shen Yaoyi, depicted the 1976 Tiananmen incident. Another special auction was held in June 2010 to commemorate the tenth anniversary of Qin Gong's death, as well as another in 2011 to promote intangible cultural heritage. As of 2024, Hanhai is under the leadership of Xu Jian (徐建), with Fu Jie (付洁) and Chen Xiaoqin (陈晓勤) as deputy general managers and Yu Haiyan (虞海燕) as art director.

According to data from Artprice, in 2011 Hanhai ranked seventh worldwide in sales, behind Phillips. It had fallen to eighth place in 2019, with a reported turnover of US$21,712,000 between 651 lots. In its Autumn 2020 auction, Hanhai reported sales worth ¥280 million (US$41,000,000). Jan Dailey of the Financial Times expressed scepticism regarding the reported figures of Chinese auction houses, noting that the domestic market is plagued by forgeries, frequent inability to meet reserves (up to 52 per cent in 2011), and non-payment. Hanhai, for instance, was sued by Su Minluo after the latter purchased a painting attributed to Wu Guanzhong that was later found to be a fake.

== Works cited ==
- "Briefs". China Daily. 2 July 1996. pp. 2–3. ProQuest 257774520.
- Buchanan, Sherry (1996). "Art – In China, Antiques are Okay Again". Worldbusiness. 2 (1): 7. ProQuest 213073867.
- "Chinese Painting Fetches Record Price". St. Louis Post. 7 October 1995. p. 04A. ProQuest 305085406.
- Chou, Nailene (27 November 2004). "Art Repatriation Driving Up Market". South China Morning Post.
- 公司简介 [Company Profile] (in Chinese). Beijing Hanhai.
- Dailey, Jan (11 May 2012). "Smoke and Mirrors". Financial Times.
- Guo, Hongyuan (December 2010). "The Economics of Chinese Art". China Today. Vol. 59, no. 12.
- 翰海春拍將舉行紀念秦公先生逝世十週年專拍 [Hanhai Spring Auction will Hold a Special Auction to Commemorate the 10th Anniversary of the Death of Mr. Qin Gong] (in Chinese). China Internet Information Center. 20 April 2010.
- Hu Xiaoyu (胡晓钰) (13 December 2020). 北京翰海2020秋拍2.8亿元收官 [Beijing Hanhai 2020 Autumn Auction Closes with 280 Million Yuan]. Beijing Business Daily (in Chinese) – via Sina.cn.
- Li, Ma (2023). China's Art Market since 1978: Regional Entrepreneurship and Global Impact. Springer. ISBN 978-3-031-34605-7.
- Liu, Shijie (28 December 2011). "Legal Risk Management for Trade of Calligraphy and Painting Works". China Daily.
- Liu, Xiongfei (18 November 2013). "Beijing's Financial Street to Host Hanhai Auction Selections Exhibition". Ministry of Culture of China.
- 回望二十年——翰海的“拍卖路 [Looking Back Over the Past 20 Years – Hanhai's 'Auction Journey']. Art 99 (in Chinese). 1 November 2014.
- Mazurkewich, Karen (5 January 2001). "Return of the Stolen Treasures". Asian Wall Street Journal. p. W1. ProQuest 315424082.
- Mazurkewich, Karen (11 May 2001). "The Bidding War For China's Art – Mainland Auction Houses are Challenging Christie's and Sotheby's". Asian Wall Street Journal. p. W1. ProQuest 315394741.
- Melikian, Souren (26 October 1996). "China Art: The Next Eldorado?". International Herald Tribune. p. 7. ProQuest 319129688.
- "Notes". China Daily. 2 July 2002. p. 9. ProQuest 257835565.
- "Qi Baishi Tops Pops". China Daily. 4 March 2009.
- "Qing Dynasty Painting Auctioned at Record Price". China Internet Information Center. 30 June 2002.
- Soudijn, Melvin; Tijhuis, Edgar (June 2003). "Some Perspectives on the Illicit Antiquities Trade in China". Art, Antiquity & Law. 8 (2): 149–165.
- "The Contemporary Art Market Report in 2019". Artprice. 2019.
- "Top Auction Houses". Art+Auction. 42 (8): 126–135. 2019.
- Wang, Shanshan (27 June 2006). "Painting Scales a Mountain for Record Price". China Daily.
- Yu Lixiao (于立霄) (10 December 2012). "Beijing's Hanhai Autumn Auction Collects RMB 540 Million, High-Quality Palace Sculptures Popular" 北京翰海秋拍5.4亿收槌 宫廷造像精品受追捧 (in Chinese). Phoenix Television.
- Zhao Yu (赵榆) (14 February 2014). "Memories of 20 Years of Chinese Cultural Relics Auctions: People and Things" 20年中国文物拍卖记忆：那些人那些事. Collection Magazine (in Chinese) – via China Writer.
- Zhong, Wei (16 November 2009). "Nostalgia for 'Red Art'". China Daily.
- Zhu, Ying (19 November 2019). "Ancient Artwork's Happy Ending". Shanghai Daily.
- Zorloni, Alessia (2013). The Economics of Contemporary Art: Markets, Strategies and Stardom. Springer. ISBN 978-3-642-32405-5.
