= Black Painting incident =

1974 Chinese political movement

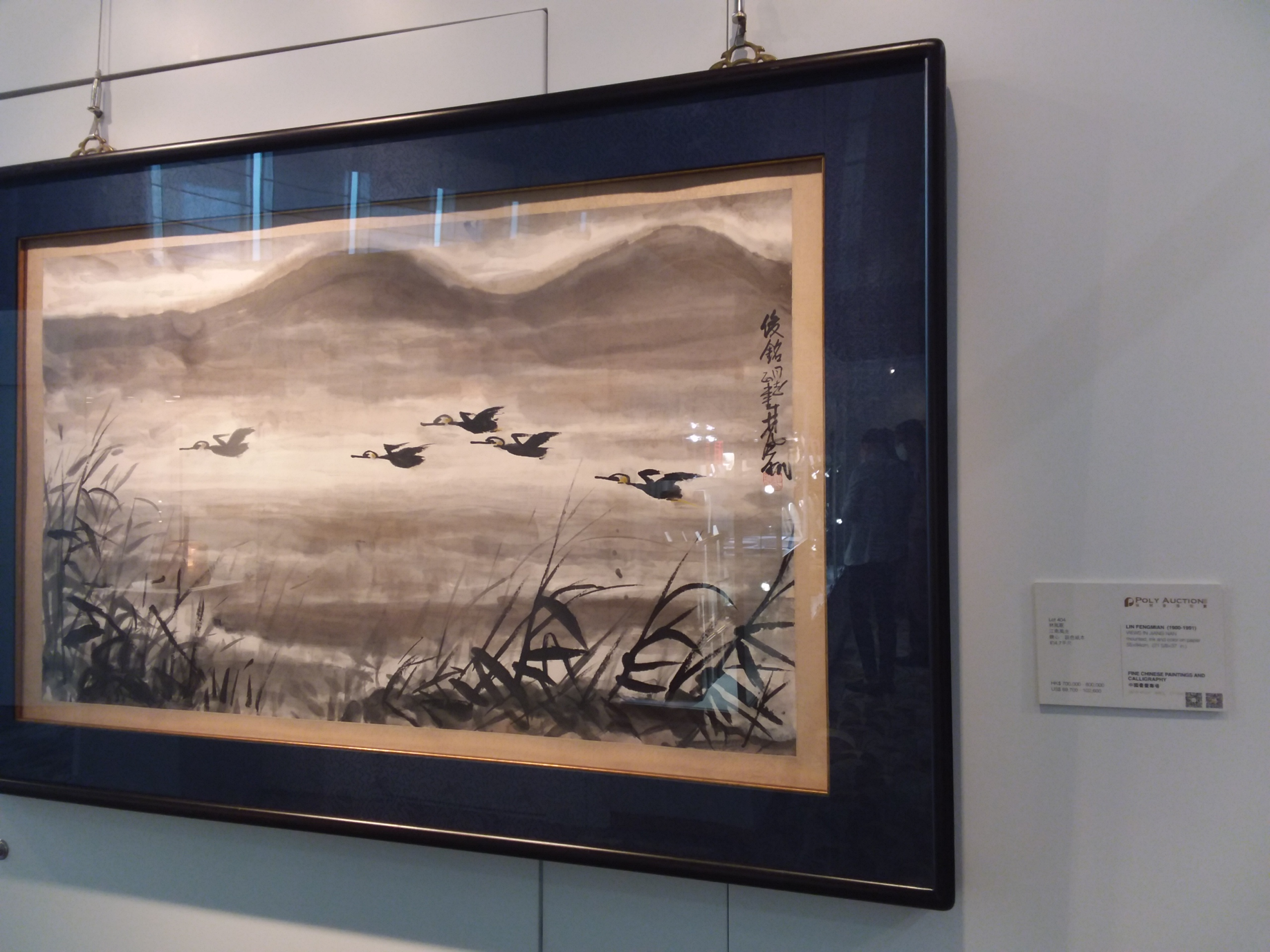
Lin Fengmian's works, who was labelled as a "Black Painter" who hated socialism. Some of Lin Fengmian's paintings were named and criticised as Black Mountain's evil water

The "Black Painting" incident, also known as the Criticizing Black Painting movement, was a political movement during the Cultural Revolution in mainland China. In the few months following January 1974, Yao Wenyuan, Jiang Qing, and others launched a criticism of Chinese paintings they considered problematic, exhibiting hundreds of "Black Paintings" in the Great Hall of the People, the National Art Museum of China, and other places. They were exhibited to the head of the central government as well as the revolutionary masses of workers, peasants, and soldiers so that the groups could criticize the paintings. There is no uniform definition of "Black Painting", though most "Black Painters" were accused of distorting, vilifying, or attacking socialism and the dictatorship of the proletariat; catering to the Western bourgeoisie and revisionism; or missing Lin Biao. The entire art circle in mainland China, including hundreds of painters such as Li Keran, Huang Yongyu, Lin Fengmian, Feng Zikai, and Li Kuchan, were implicated. Among them, Huang Yongyu's painting "Owl" was listed at the top of the "Black Paintings Exhibition". The "Black Painting" incident was related to the "Criticize Lin, Criticize Confucius" campaign, and the criticism was thinly veiled at Zhou Enlai, the then-Premier of the State Council.

== History ==
=== Background ===
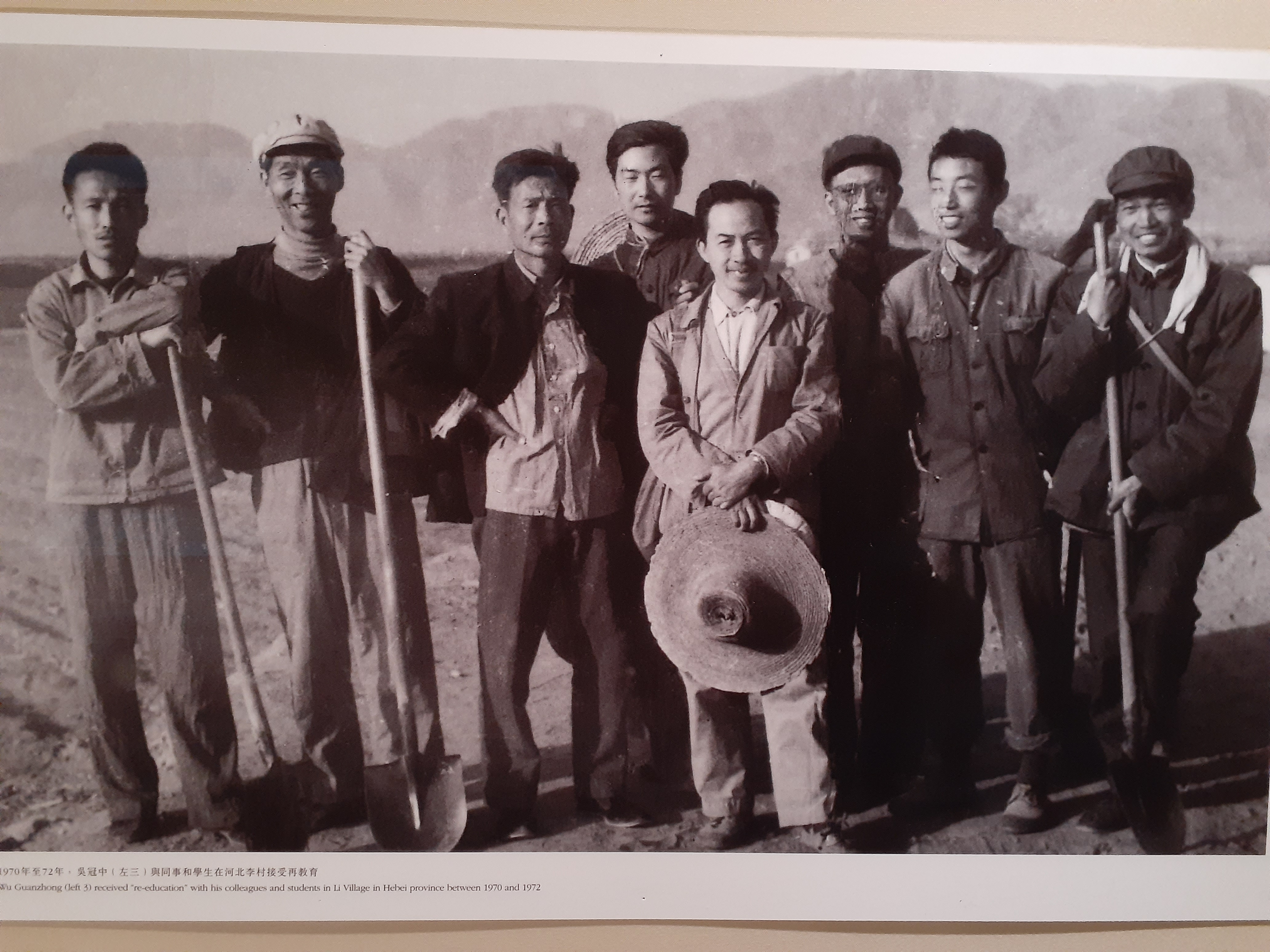
During the Cultural Revolution, the well-known painter Wu Guanzhong (third from left) and his colleagues and students were re-educated in Hebei.

In 1966, Mao Zedong and others launched the Cultural Revolution in mainland China As early as 1964, Jiang Qing, Kang Sheng, and others criticised the late master of traditional Chinese painting Qi Baishi. In the early stage of the Cultural Revolution, Qi Baishi was "down", and Huang Zhou became the first Black Painter to be publicly criticised In the late Cultural Revolution, from 1971 to 1973, feeling that hanging overwhelmingly massive slogans of Mao's "supreme instructions" in places where foreign guests were received, as was done all over the country, was inappropriate, Zhou Enlai, then Premier of the State Council, instructed several times that the artworks arranged by major hotels should conform to the national style and contain the spirit of the times, they should also demonstrate the high level of artistic attainment in China. At the same time, Zhou Enlai and others spearheaded the recovery and development of foreign trade, with exports resuming in 1972. Zhou Enlai, Li Xiannian, and others believed that exporting paintings could earn foreign exchange, but found few buyers were interested in the revolutionary propaganda paintings. They printed publications and published a large number of paintings by artists such as Li Keran. Among them was the art catalogue "Chinese Painting" compiled and printed by the Shanghai Arts and Crafts Branch of China National Light Industrial Products Import and Export Corporation, in full color and with Chinese and English texts, as a marketing material for exporting Chinese fine art.

After the Lin Biao incident in 1971, Zhou Enlai called back some well-known painters such as Wu Zuoren, Li Keran, and Li Kuchan back to Beijing from the May Seventh Cadre School they'd been sent to, in the needs of preparing for Nixon's visit to China in 1972. Zhou Enlai pointed out that it was inappropriate to hang portraits of Chairman Mao and Mao Zedong's Quotations everywhere in hotels that received foreign guests, including overseas Chinese, Hong Kongese, Macanese, and Taiwanese compatriots. Most of these called back artists were painting for hotels thus got the nickname "Hotel School". A group of them was assigned the task of decorating the new east wing of Beijing Hotel. A panoramic mural of the scenic Yangtze River was designed to encircle the central hall of the building, and would be completed by Yuan Yunfu, Wu Guanzhong, Zhu Danian, and Huang Yongyu. In October 1973, during a sketch travel along Yangtze River for the mural, Huang Yongyu painted an owl for a friend, which was later listed as the foremost of the "Black Paintings".

=== Timeline ===
On the evening of November 23, 1973, Wang Mantian (Mao Zedong's niece), then deputy leader of the Cultural Group of the State Council, along with Gao Jinde, Shao Yu, the heads of the Art Department of the Cultural Group, and others raised the issue of "Black Paintings" for the first time at a meeting at the Beijing Friendship Hotel. Since then, the forces of the Gang of Four have launched a national "Black Paintings" tracing activity. On December 15 of the same year, the People's Daily published a commentary article "We should attach importance to class struggle in the field of culture and art" by "Chu Lan", in which indicated:

The overthrown landlord bourgeoisie refused to give up their ideological and cultural positions easily. In some corners, they were still stubbornly resisting. For example, in some places, some people play bad dramas, tell bad stories, sing bad songs, and secretly or openly compete with the proletariat for ideological and cultural battle positions. ... We should mobilise the masses to consciously resist the spread of bad dramas, bad books, bad songs, and bad paintings, and use the literature and art of Socialism to occupy the battle position, to effectively defend and develop the victory of the proletarian cultural revolution.

On January 2, 1974, Yao Wenyuan severely criticised the art catalogue "Chinese Painting" in Shanghai, and this was regarded as the official beginning of the "black painting incident". At a meeting of the Shanghai Municipal Party Committee, Yao Wenyuan accused the catalogue as full of "Black Shan shui", a "restorationist tide of the bourgeoisie", a "merchandise pandering to the Western bourgeoisie and revisionists", and "a publication of authentic Confucianism". The criticizing "black painting" campaign is implicitly aimed at Zhou Enlai. Before the Chinese New Year in 1974, Wang Maintain led a group of close associates to Beijing Hotel, Grand Hotel des Wagons-Lits and other places to find "black paintings", planning a black paintings exhibition to "fight back the resurgence of the black line of art and literature on the art front". She also sent people to more than a dozen provinces and cities across the country to search for "black paintings". Despite this, there is no clear standard as to what constitutes a black painting. Ultimately, they selected more than 200 paintings and held a "Black Painting Exhibition" in Beijing in mid-February. The exhibition was described "to carry out Criticize Lin, Criticize Confucius campaign according to the reality of the art front" and was held in the Great Hall of the People and the National Art Museum of China. Another version said that the paintings were exhibited in March in the Great Hall of the People exclusively for the Party's central leadership to examine, then in early April were exhibited at the National Art Museum of China for the revolutionary masses to visit and criticize.

On March 29, 1974, the article "A Critique of Paintings Created for Certain Restaurants and Hotels" was published in the Beijing Daily, marking the first public denunciation of "black paintings." In addition to criticizing Huang Yongyu's "Owl", the article also attacked works by artists such as Zong Qixiang, Li Keran, and Wu Zuoren. On April 5, Beijing Daily published a report on Beijing Hotel's campaign to criticize "black paintings", the report wrote:

Comrades from the Central Academy of Arts and Design sent two big-character posters to the hotel, sharply criticizing the hotel’s leadership for giving the green light to the resurgence of the 'black line' in art and literature, as evidenced by the black paintings and bad paintings commissioned for the decoration of the new building's rooms. These two revolutionary big-character posters shocked the hotel's leadership. They convened the party committee that same night... and organized staffs to view the black paintings exhibition. Everyone was very angry after seeing the black and bad paintings, and a wave of criticism quickly arose. Within two weeks, they wrote more than 260 critical articles and held nine criticism rallies, in which more than 70 people spoke.

The Criticizing Black Painting movement also spread to Shanghai, Shaanxi, Hubei and other places. Many critical articles appeared in newspapers and periodicals in various places, which affected the entire art world. In Shaanxi province alone, more than 20 painters were labeled "black painter" or "reactionist painter", including Shi Lu, then chairman of the Shaanxi branch of the China Artists Association. The relevant authorities in Shaanxi even set up a preparatory team for criticizing "reactionist painter" Shi Lu, and mobilized from universities and colleges in Xi'an dozens of scholars in the fields of politics, literature, history, and fine arts, to comment on Shi Lu's so-called "black paintings", with the results of which compiled a publication "Annotation on Shi Lu's Reactionary Calligraphy and Painting".

== Conclusion ==
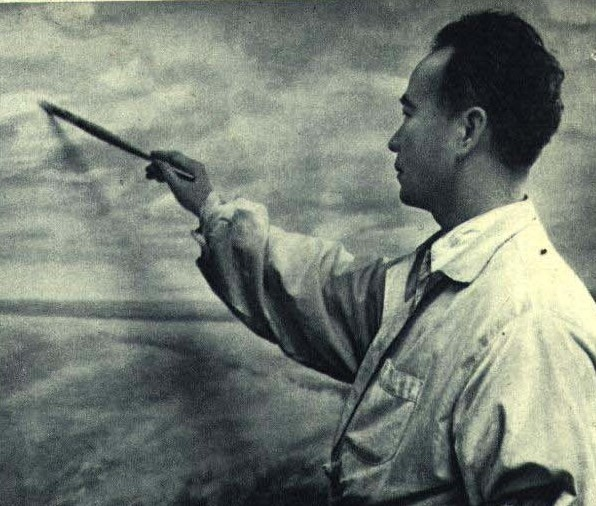
Wu Zuoren, who was criticized as a "black painter"

In April 1974, when the campaign of criticizing "black paintings" reached its climax, Mao Zedong issued a "supreme instruction" on the campaign and expressed his disagreement: "Chinese paintings, with splashes of ink, how can they not be black?... Owls often have one eye open and one eye closed, naturally.” Afterwards, the movement gradually cooled down. However, until the end of 1974, there was still a few critical articles being published. On November 26, 1974, the People's Daily published an article signed by "Xiao Luan", mentioned the campaign in this manner:

The Lin Biao Anti-Party Clique used fine art to distort history, to erect monuments for themselves, and to create counter-revolutionary public opinion in politics. After the Lin Biao Anti-Party Clique was smashed, a small number of people in the art world, with ulterior motives, continued to use painting to stir up trouble, distort and uglify the socialist reality, and vent their resentment and hatred for the Party and socialism. Some of the black paintings that were exposed and criticized not long ago are of this ilk. Under their brushes, light became darkness, and happiness became disasters. Since the launch of the Criticize Lin, Criticize Confucius Movement, the broad masses of workers, peasants and soldiers and revolutionary art workers have taken Marxism, Leninism and Mao Zedong Thought as their guide to criticize Liu Shaoqi and Lin Biao's revisionist line, to criticize all kinds of revisionist trends in literature and art, and to criticize the bourgeoisie's use of art for revolution. Through this struggle, our revolutionary unity has been strengthened, our ranks have been expanded, and the revolution in fine art has been pushed forward. Experience has shown that the excellent situation is achieved through struggle.

=== Examples of "Black Painting" Criticism ===
Huang Yongyu's "Owl" was listed the foremost artwork in the "Black Paintings Exhibition", and per some documents it was defined as "the No. 1 counter-revolutionary black painting". Because of this, Huang Yongyu and his family were sent to the re-education camp. On March 29, 1974, Beijing Daily published an article titled "A Critique of Paintings Created for Certain Restaurants and Hotels", it stated:

Look at this owl with one eye open and one eye closed. Doesn't it fully expose the creator's hatred of the reality of the socialist revolution and the Cultural Revolution? Before the Great Proletarian Cultural Revolution, the creators of this black painting had concocted a series of reactionary fables with animals as the theme. He viciously attacked the dictatorship of the proletariat in the superstructure field as a "spiders web", and slandered the Great Leap Forward as a "donkey turning the millstone" that could only go around in circles, and so on. This is the man who has always been resentful of the criticism of him by the revolutionary masses during the Great Proletarian Cultural Revolution, and even engraved the words "lawless and undisciplined" on a seal, in a vain attempt to negate the law of the dictatorship of the proletariat and subvert the socialist regime. The poisonous weed "Owl" is precisely the concentrated expression of this reactionary mentality of the creator.

In the art catalogue "Chinese Painting", there is a picture titled "Greeting the Spring" by Chen Dayu, depicting a rooster crowing in front of winter jasmine blossoms. In this regard, Yao Wenyuan's critique of this painting was:

The painting features a few pale winter jasmines at the upper end of the frame and an angry rooster is prominently depicted in the whole painting. The rooster's beak is tightly closed, its crest is raised high, its hackle feathers puffed out, its claws grip the ground, its eyes rolled back in anger, and its tail raised to the sky, completely exuding a fierce and aggressive air and posture as if it is ready to pounce on "spring" at any moment ... This is not welcoming the spring, it is completely an extreme hatred of the socialist spring and the prosperous scene after the Great Proletarian Cultural Revolution. This furious, tail-raised rooster embodies the dark psychology of a small pinch of "restoration maniacs" in today's society. They are unwilling to accept their defeat and are always ready to fight the proletariat to the death.

On May 31, 1974, Shanghai's Wenhui Bao published an article signed by Lin Chengfu titled Black Mountains and Evil Waters Harboring Malicious Intent, focused on criticizing Li Keran's works:

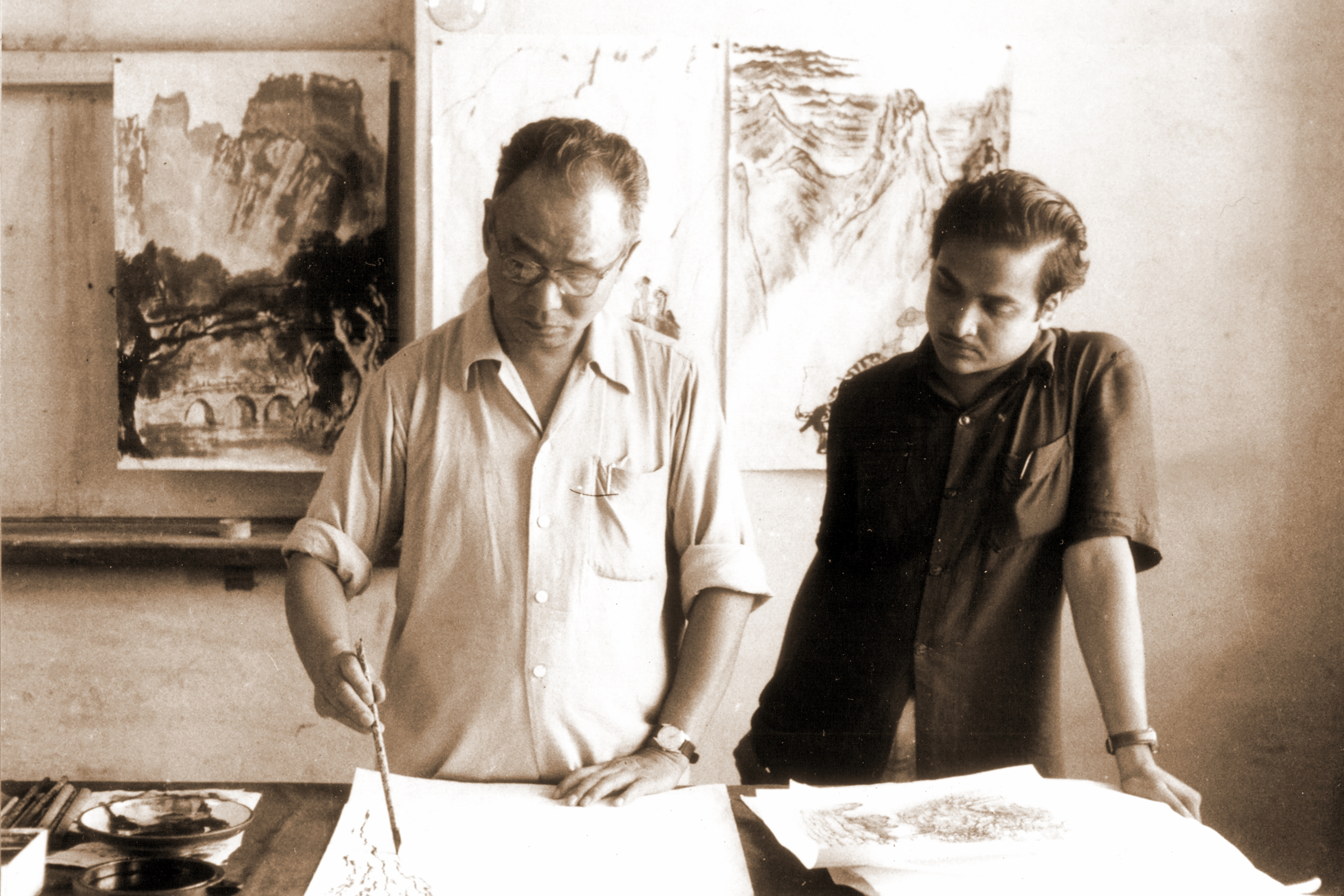
Li Keran (left) is known for his landscape painting

In front of us is a copy of Chinese Painting. The first thing that catches our eyes is a puddle of ink on the cover. After a closer look, it is a Chinese painting titled Landscape. Such a painting of black mountain and evil water is placed on the cover, and it even occupies two-thirds of the cover, which shows how much the editor and printer valued it... Look at this picture, in the foreground, there are strange rocks standing tall, resembling ghosts looming, and darkness all around, which is creepy and terrifying. In the distance, there are wolf-toothed barren mountains and ridges, entangled with purple-gray clouds, and the only strip of sky is full of dark clouds, so oppressive that one can't breathe. At the foot of the mountain, a winding and twisted stream of filthy water flows, and a few listless sailboats are drawn crookedly. The whole picture is distorted and grotesque, with black mountains and black water, smeared haphazardly, making one's hair stand on end. Also in this album is a landscape painting entitled Mount Huangshan, an old work of this "famous artist" in 1963, and it is the same. In the middle of the painting is a black mess, and a few sparse dead trees are dotted on the bare mountain and rocks. In the lower left corner, a corner of a pale ancient pavilion is deliberately drawn, and a ghost-like figure is added, which is even more ugly and unbearable to look at. Under the creator's brush, the beautiful and lush Huangshan was ruined into such a state!

== See also ==
- Criticize Lin, Criticize Confucius
- Counterattack the Right-Deviationist Reversal-of-Verdicts Trend
- Struggle session
- Four Olds
- Literary inquisition
