= Wang Nong =

Chinese artist

Wang Nong (1926–March 26, 2013) was a Chinese artist born in Fengtian (now Shenyang), Liaoning Province. His birth name was Litian, and he also went by the name "Guanwai Ren", or "Outsider." In 1949 he migrated to Taiwan, where he pursued a career in graphic design in textile factories as well as in comic creation. Eventually, he focused solely on his artistic pursuits, and received the first-place award in the Chinese painting category in the Zhongshan Literary and Art Creation Awards in 1978. After the lifting of martial law in Taiwan on July 15, 1987, Wang actively engaged in artistic exchanges between Taiwan and mainland China. Aside from ink paintings of horses, he also used characters from Chinese opera as a major creative theme.

== Biography ==
Wang Nong's father, Wang Youwen, and his mother, Luo Shuwen, were both natives of Heishan County, Liaoning Province, with ancestral connections to Zhang Zuolin, the warlord of Northeast China in the early years of the Republic of China. Wang's mother was also childhood friends with Zhang Xueliang, the son of Zhang Zuolin, which resulted in Wang Youwen being appointed as the director of the Liaoning Provincial Public Security Bureau. In 1931, due to the Mukden Incident, Wang Nong and his parents relocated to North China, northern Suzhou, Shanghai, Jiangsu, Zhejiang, Jiangxi, and other locations. After completing elementary school, Wang briefly attended the 13th Middle School of Jiangxi, then transferred to the Agricultural Vocational School of Huizhou, Anhui Province, majoring in agriculture and forestry. In 1943, he began studying painting under the guidance of his school's art teacher, Meng Dazong. In 1944, he worked in the propaganda department of the Army's 52nd Division Youth Camp, where he became fascinated with Chinese opera after being introduced to theatrical performances. In 1945, following the end of the Second Sino-Japanese War, Wang returned home and enrolled in the Liaodong College of Fine Arts. In 1946, he attended the National Beiping Art School's Western Painting Department, studying under renowned painters such as Xu Beihong, Li Keran, Li Kuchan, Li Hua, and Wu Zuoren. Xu Beihong, the principal of the art school, once stated, "Wang Nong is a multitalented artist born with artistic talent."

In 1949, Wang Nong left Beiping and, after traveling through Hangzhou and Shanghai, arrived in Taiwan via Fuzhou. He worked as a propaganda soldier alongside the educator and artist Ye Zuibai. He also frequently published comics in newspapers and magazines. In 1951, he participated in the anti-communist art exhibition organized by the Political Warfare Department of the Ministry of National Defense and the Taiwan Provincial Department of Education, winning first place in the comic category under the pseudonym Wang Laosan. In 1952, he joined the Taipei Textile Factory of the Taiwan Mining and Manufacturing Company as a graphic designer. In 1954, he held a batik painting exhibition at the International House in Taipei. Between 1964 and 1967, he assisted Hong Kong film director Li Hanxiang (also a fellow alumnus of the Beiping Art School) in designing costumes, scenery, flags, and horse decorations for the costume film Hsi Shih: Beauty of Beauties, produced by Grand Motion Pictures Co., Ltd. In 1967 he started his own wallpaper factory, but the business failed, prompting him to return to art. In 1973, Wang held a solo ink painting exhibition at the National Taiwan Museum of Fine Arts. In 1975, his ink painting work Beyond the Great Wall was recommended by the National Museum of History for the 2nd International Biennial Exhibition of Uruguay. In 1978, he received the first-place award in the Chinese painting category at the Zhongshan Literary and Art Creation Awards. In 1983, he was invited to hold his first solo exhibition at the National Museum of History. In 1983 and 1984, he held two solo exhibitions at the Hong Kong City Hall. In 1989, he was invited by the China Artists Association and Xu Beihong Memorial Museum to hold a special exhibition at the National Art Museum of China in Beijing, which led to him traveling and holding exhibitions across China. Wang died on March 28, 2013, in Taipei at the age of 88.

== Artistry ==
Art historian Liu Chuanming noted that Wang Nong incorporated Western painting techniques, such as chiaroscuro, light and shadow, and perspective, into his Chinese painting creations, based on his foundation in Western painting techniques. He depicted landscapes and animal subjects related to his childhood memories of migration in China's border regions. In addition to animal paintings, Wang's passion for Peking opera led him to depict characters from the opera in his artworks.

Xu Beihong once invited Qi Baishi to demonstrate his techniques to students at the Beiping Art School. Qi Baishi's daily routine involved using ink lines that could penetrate to the back of paper until the paper turned completely black. Wang Nong adopted this technique of using lines and ink to create a translucent effect. The painter Xu Qingping stated that Wang had a straightforward personality typical of people from Northeast China, and he had a good grasp of the local customs and natural forms of China's border regions, and created a sense of openness in his painting compositions. Wang used splash-ink techniques to create a strong sense of movement and momentum in his depictions of horses. The painter Liang Junwu noted that Wang portrayal of Mongolian horses emphasized the developed chest, leg tendons, robust physique, and thick hoof horn of the horses.

Wang Nong attended performances of the Peking opera troupe at the Beiping Art School, and also took the stage as an amateur enthusiast, which influenced his creation of Peking opera-themed artwork. Xu Qingping analyzed that Wang first outlined the overall silhouette of the characters using large color blocks and then added details such as facial expressions, gestures, and props such as whips or sticks, completing the brushwork in one go. By unifying the brushwork, the artist brought vitality to the composition, which combined with vivid color contrasts created the artistic effect of the artwork.
