= Christian Lu =

French painter

- Chinese: 陆永安
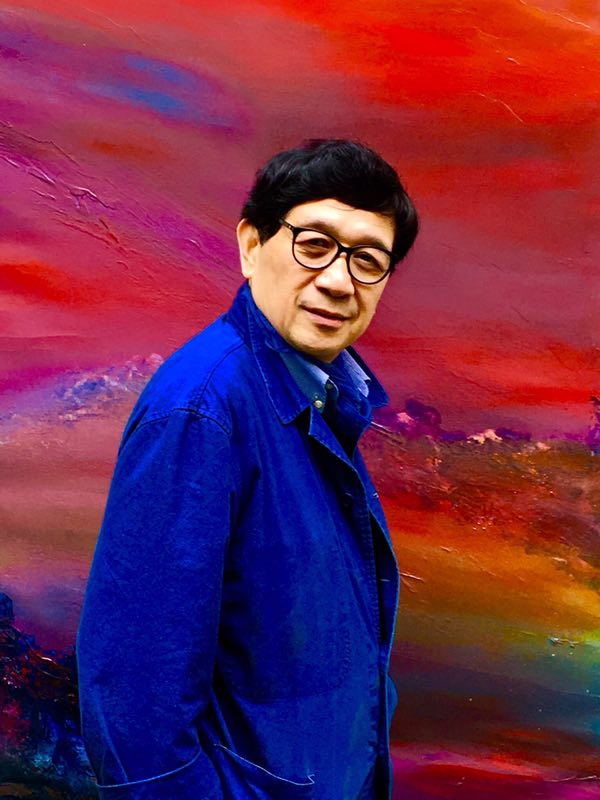
- Christian Lu
- Born: March 18, 1951 (age 75); Shanghai, China
- Other name: Lu Yongan
- Occupation: Painter
- Father: Lu Benmian (Chinese: 陆本勉)

Christian Lu or Lu Yongan (Chinese: 陆永安; pinyin: lù yǒngān) is a French painter of Chinese origin. He was born on 18 March 1951 in Shanghai, and has been established in Paris in France since 1981.

== Biography ==
His father, Lu Benmian (陆 本 勉), is the first Chinese manufacturer of acrylic fiber and his grandfather, Lu Junxiu (陆君秀), is a teacher.

Since his childhood, he has worked with painters from different schools in North and South China, such as Liu Haisu (刘海粟), Yan Wenliang (颜文樑, Wu Zuoren (吴 作人), Li Keran (李可染), Lin Fengmian (林风眠) ), Lu Yanshao (陆俨少), Guan Shanyue (关山月), and Guan Liang (关 良). He learned painting theory from Shen Zicheng (沈子丞).

In November 2016, an exhibition was dedicated to him at the National Museum of China in Beijing.

In 2018, French President Emmanuel Macron, on an official visit to China, handed over to his Chinese counterpart, Xi Jinping, a work by Christian Lu, called "The Force of a Dream", referring to the Chinese dream, on behalf of Chinese community of France.

Dreams of Clouds, an exhibition in November 2022 at the National Art Museum of China in Beijing, shows dozens of Lu's oil paintings made since 2014.

== Gallery ==
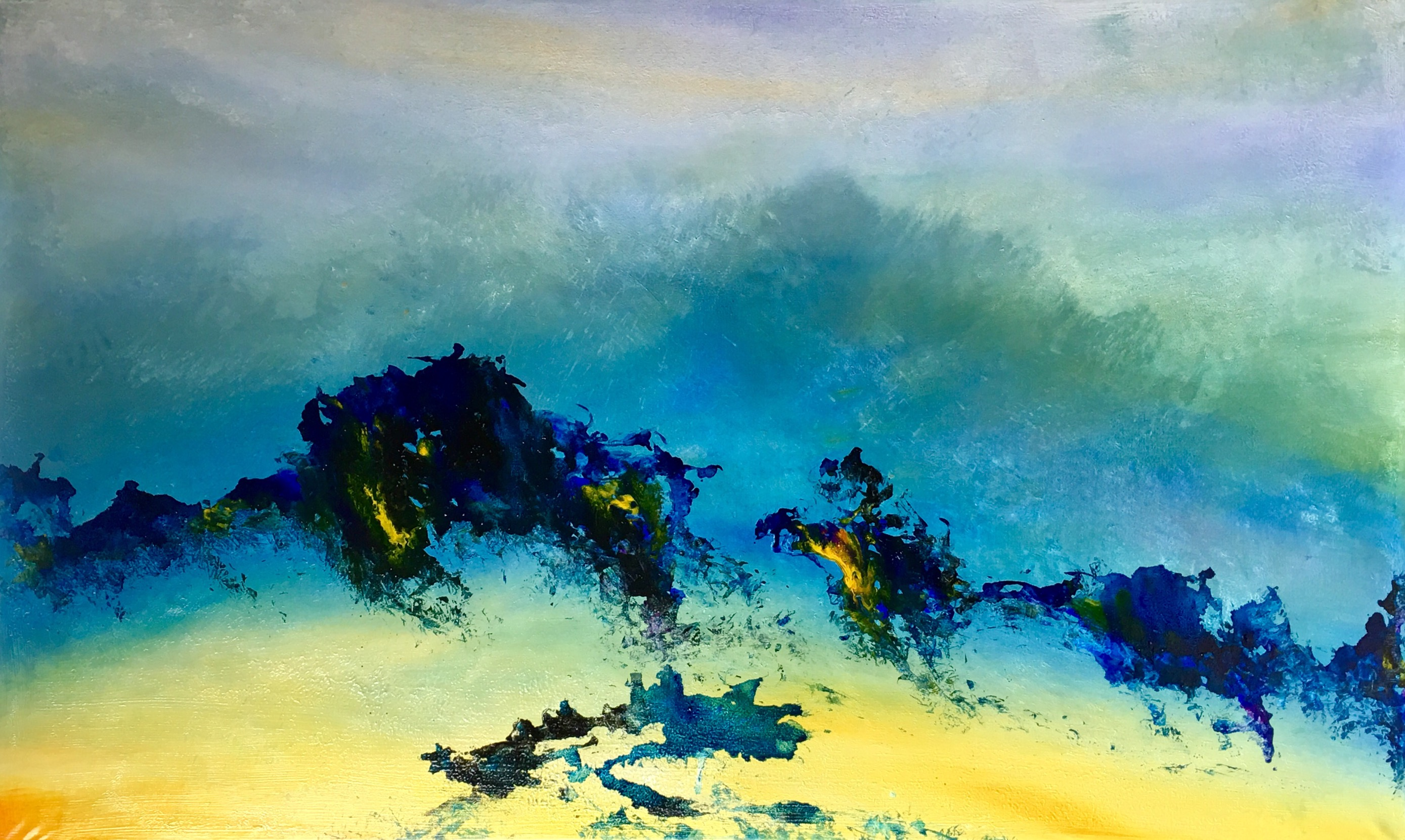
The strength of a dream N° 2, Oil on canvas 2015

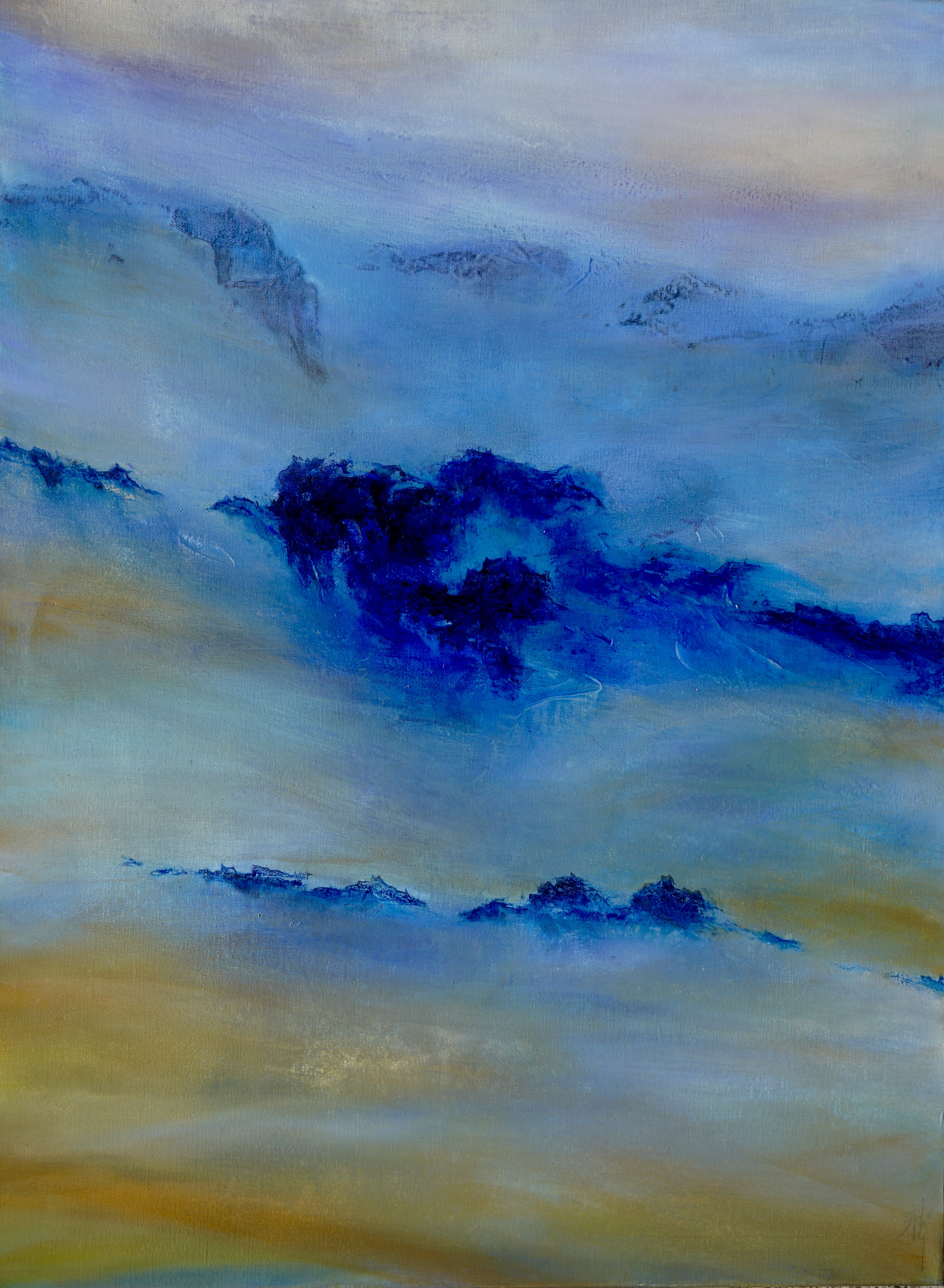
No limit, Oil on canvas 2015

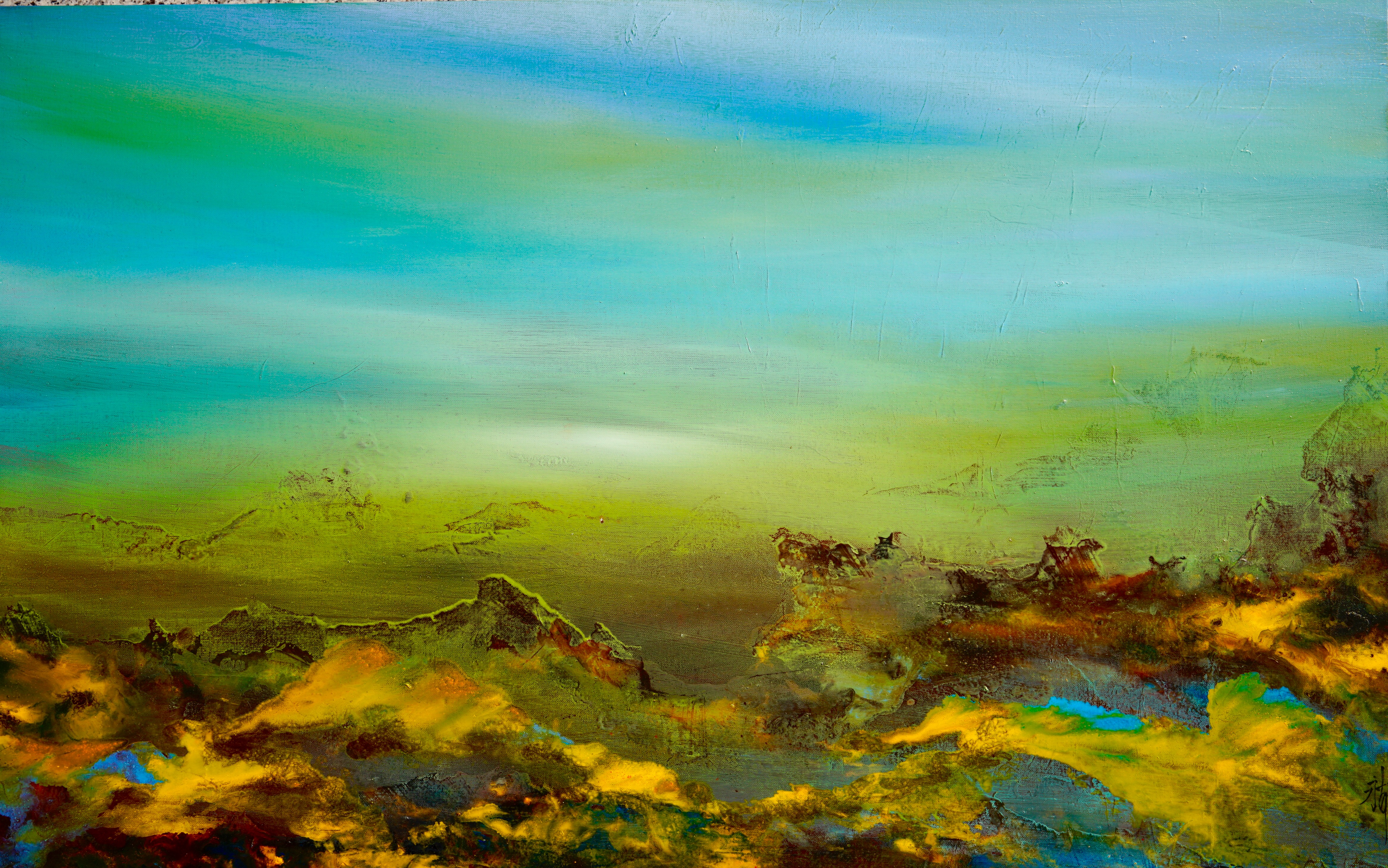
Untitled, Oil on canvas 2014
