= Gu Wenda =

Chinese contemporary artist

- 谷文达
- Born: 1955; Shanghai, China
- Occupation: Contemporary Artist
- Years active: 1980s–present

Gu Wenda (simplified Chinese: 谷文达; traditional Chinese: 谷文達; pinyin: Gǔ Wéndá) (born 1955, Shanghai) is a contemporary artist from China who lives and works in New York City. Much of his works are themed around traditional Chinese calligraphy and poetry. His works also often use human hair.

Gu lives in Brooklyn Heights with his wife, interior designer Kathryn Scott, though he also maintains studios in Shanghai and Xi'an in China.

== Early life ==
Gu Wenda was born in Shanghai in 1955; his parents were bank employees, his grandparents on his mother's side worked in wool. His paternal grandfather, an actor, was one of the few to appear in Chinese films at the time, and the first to introduce the spoken word into the traditionally sung Chinese theatre. As a result of the Cultural Revolution, Gu's grandparents were taken away for "reeducation", and much of the artistic documents and objects in the house were seized or destroyed by the authorities.

Nevertheless, like many young Chinese of the time, Gu aspired to grow up to become one of the Red Guards, and eventually succeeded. As one of the Guards, he worked to simplify the Chinese language, and to encourage people to embrace new attitudes towards their old language; this was the time when he became educated in, and interested in, the traditional calligraphy which would later play a major role in his artworks. He was also taught woodcarving at this time, but relates it as being a strictly practical exercise, devoid of real creativity and art. He devoted much of his free time to dreams of art and fame, and to ink painting in private.

Though he was meant to later be sent off to a further wood-carving school, he was instead sent to design school, where he continued his pursuits in painting. Teachers at this school encouraged and aided him, and saw the beginning of his career as an artist. He would later study at the China Academy of Art in Hangzhou, under Lu Yanshao. Though he originally resisted tradition, he has since come to appreciate that one must understand tradition in order to better rebel against it.

== Career ==
In the 1980s, he began the first of a series of projects centered on the invention of meaningless, false Chinese ideograms, depicted as if they were truly old and traditional. One exhibition of this type, held in Xi'an in 1986, featuring paintings of fake ideograms on a massive scale, was shut down by the authorities who, being unable to read it, assumed it carried a subversive message. The exhibit was later allowed to re-open on the condition that only professional artists could attend.

After waiting for a student visa for five years, Gu came to the United States in 1987, at the age of 32, this journey being his first airplane experience. Asked if he left China for political reasons, he insists that, rather, he wanted to come to New York to seek a more international audience for his art, and to live and work in the contemporary art center of the world. After spending some time in San Francisco, he moved to New York, and put his art work aside for a year while he learned English, and served as artist-in-residence at the University of Minnesota for a few months.

Turning from his work on language, Gu developed an interest in bodily materials, and in understanding humanity, across ethnic and national boundaries, through hair and other bodily substances. One exhibit he produced, organized around sanitary napkins sent to him by women from sixty countries, was attacked by feminist movements and refused to be shown at every venue he approached. Some of his other works included the use of semen and a placenta, which are supposedly far less shocking materials in China than in the West, as they are sometimes used as part of traditional Chinese medicine. However, most of his creations in this vein focus on hair. These are known collectively as the United Nations Project. The United Nations Project was exhibited in the Baker-Berry Library at Dartmouth College for four months in 2007.

In some places, such as Łódź, Poland, where his exhibition of piles of human hair were first seen, they have brought powerful resistance from those who see it as a reminder of the piles of hair generated at the Nazi concentration camps where Jewish prisoners had their heads shaved. The exhibition was closed in Poland after only twenty-four hours, and despite attempts to play up the international message and theme of his work, and to deny any intentional reference to The Holocaust or other such tragedies, the exhibit received a similar response in parts of Sweden, Russia, and Israel.

Gu's work today focuses extensively on ideas of culture, and his identity. He tends not to discuss or compare himself to other Chinese artists, and much of his work does not seek to embrace nor rebel against Chinese traditions. His work with human hair, including paintings created with a brush made from human hair, painted in public, continues the theme of the United Nations and seeks to evoke thoughts of human identity and unity.

== Pseudo-languages ==
Gu is most well known for his use of pseudo-languages in most of his works. Ever since the exhibition of Chinese Painting Invitational in Wuhan City in 1984, Gu's large scale ink paintings have been increasingly exhibited. His first personal exhibition was closed by the authorities to public audiences before the opening because of the invented, fake, miswritten Chinese characters, and printing style calligraphy. After investigation it reopened only to the professional art circuit. The works from this show are regarded as the beginning of conceptual ink art in china.

In his work Temple of Heaven, he covers the room with ancient Chinese seal script: the oldest written form of the Chinese language, which most people can no longer speak. In other works he develops various unreadable texts based on language influences in the area in which he is creating an installment. Gu states that the unreadable texts are used to evoke the limitations of human knowledge. In his poster for the Cultural Revolution, Gu's use of miswritten, deformed, or crossed letters signifies the meaninglessness of the written word and the futility of human endeavor in a communist society.

== United Nations Project ==
Gu Wenda began his fifteen-year ongoing global art project in 1993. The United Nations Project is a series of installations that involves the use of human hair and cryptic calligraphy to convey a meaning of "Internationalism." He has completed 21 total projects and sub-projects and more than one million people have contributed their hair to this art project. Gu Wenda refers to his installations as national monuments and human hair was collected from people of many different races and glued together to symbolize the diversity of races coming together and fusing humanity into “a brave new racial identity.” The characters that Gu uses are often old characters from an ancient Chinese dialect or a fusion of the native language in which the installation resides with Chinese characters. Gu's use of these symbols are meant to symbolize fragmentation of communication and human disconnect caused by language and culture. The use of hair from all different races either glued together to fashion a curtain or braided symbolizes the biological interconnectedness of human kind and Gu's optimism towards achieving true "Internationalism."

On his website Gu states: 'During its more than ten year length, United Nations art project will travel throughout five continents, in approximately twenty different countries which I have selected due to their historical, civilization and political importance. By utilizing the real hair of the local living population, i'm strongly relating to their historical and cultural contexts, to create monumental installations and land arts to capture each country's identity, building on profound events in each country's history. These individual installations are national monuments to the whole art project of United Nations. The notions such as transculturalism, transnationalism, hybridization are goals of the final ceremony of the project. In a few years into twenty-first century, a giant wall will be composed solely from the pure human hair from the integration of the national monument events. The human hair woven world pseudo-languages co-existing on the wall.'

Timeline of United Nations

1993

- United Nations-Poland Monument: Hospitalized History Museum (History Museum of Lodz & the Artists Museum, Lodz, Poland)

1994

- United Nations-Holland Monument: V.O.C.-W.I.C. (The Kroller-Muller Museum, The Netherlands)
- United Nations-Italy Monument: God & Children (Enrico Gariboldi Arte Contemporanea, Milan, Italy)

1995

- United Nations-Usa Monument 2: Dreamerica (Steinbaum Krass Gallery, New York City, USA)
- United Nations-Israel Monument: The Holy Land (Israeli Cultural Minister & The Artists Museum Tel-Aviv Center, Israel)
- United Nations-USA Monument 1: Post-Cmoellotniinaglpiostm (Space Untitled Gallery, New York City, USA)

1996

- United Nations-Britain Monument: The Maze (Angel Row Gallery in Nottingham, London, England)
- United Nations-Sweden & Russia Monument: Interpol (Center For Contemporary Art & Architecture, Stockholm, Sweden)

1997

- United Nations-Africa Monument: The World Praying Wall (Institute of Contemporary Art, Johannesburg, South Africa)
- United Nations-Hong Kong Monument: The Historical Clash (Collection of Hanart Gallery, Hong Kong, China)
- United Nations-Taiwan Monument: The Mythos of Lost Dynasties (Hanart Gallery, Taipei, Taiwan)

1998

- United Nations- China Monument: Temple of Heaven (PS1 Contemporary Art Center, New York City, USA)
- United Nations-Canadian Monument: The Metamorphosis (The University of British Columbia, Vancouver, Canada)

1999

- United Nations: The Wall of the Millennium Script (Collection of Hanart Gallery, Hong Kong, China)
- United Nations: Babble of the Millennium (San Francisco Museum of Modern Art, San Francisco, USA)

2000

- United Nations: Temple of Exoticisms (5th Lyon Diennale, Lyon, France)
- United Nations: Man & Space (South Korea and Hispid Company, Japan)
- United Nations: Great Wall of the Millennium (The Art Gallery of New York State University at Buffalo, Buffalo, USA)

2001

- United Nations- Australia Monument: Epnagcliifsihc (National Gallery of Australia, Canberra, Australia)

2002

- United Nations: United 7561 Kilometers (The National Endowment for the Arts, The Andy Warhol Foundation for the Visual Arts, The Texas Commission on the Arts)

2004

- United Nations- China Monument: The Great Wall of People (Albright Knox Gallery, Buffalo)
- United Nations: United Hexagon (The Art Gallery of the University of Pittsburgh, Pittsburgh, USA)

== Papers ==
Some papers concerning Gu Wenda are housed at the Freer Gallery of Art and Arthur M. Sackler Gallery Archives. Gu's correspondence with Dr. Marcus Jacobson, an original catalogue of Gu's first exhibition in North America, and some photographs of Gu are included.

== Other notable works ==
In 1993, Gu began another ongoing project entitled "Forest of Stone Steles - Retranslation & Rewriting Tang Poetry". In this project, Gu carved 50 stone steles with a unique interpretation of Tang poems formed from a literal translation of the poems from Chinese to English and then a sound translation from English back to Chinese. Gu states that the 'forest of stone steles reflects the changing world of cultural import and export, cultural assimilation and alienation from each other, and consummation of one culture by another.' The texts on the stones are supposed to be representative of contemporary culture's influence through intercultural misunderstandings. With these texts the artist aims to suggest the possibility of a new culture that thrives from the recognition of this misunderstanding and exchange from each other.

From 1999 to 2001, Gu worked on Ink Alchemy, a project originating from the famous Shanghai Cao Sugong ink factory. It uses a genetic product made of powdered hair for an installation as well as for ink painting. About the concept behind "Ink Alchemy" Gu states: 'Traditionally, the Shanghai Medical Factory produces hair powder for medicinal purposes. Powdered human hair is used as a medical treatment for anxiety. In traditional ink fabrication, charcoal powder is used as the black pigment material. The medical factory has invented a hair powder especially formulated to be the fundamental pigment for my liquid ink and ink stick following the original Chinese prescription of powdered human hair, ironically and symbolically, the human hair-made ink is now given a conceptual function to cure cultural anxiety.'

He also worked on Tea Alchemy, which was created in a rice paper factory in Jing County in China that has made traditional rice paper for over a thousand years. Tea Alchemy uses green tea and traditional rice paper making methods to create green tea paper. Those national treasures of china are given a completely new meaning and life. GU states that 'this project will combine authentic green tea leaves with the historical method of making rice paper. The result is the “new way of tea” - the painting and writing on tea paper will create “new way of tea culture” or “cultured tea”, altering our experience from the enjoyment of drinking to the enjoyment of art.'
