= 1993 in art =

Events from the year 1993 in art.

== Events ==
- May – Jay Jopling opens the London gallery White Cube. Tracey Emin's first major exhibition, "My Major Retrospective 1963–1993" (sic.) opens here on 19 November.
- 27 May – Via dei Georgofili Massacre: A car bomb planted outside the Uffizi Gallery in Florence by the Mafia kills five people and irretrievably destroys three paintings, including an Adoration of the shepherds (1620) by Gerard van Honthorst.
- 21 June – Tate St Ives gallery opens in Cornwall, England.
- July – Multiple artworks are stolen from the National Art Museum of Azerbaijan.
- 18 August – The 14th century Kapellbrücke covered wooden truss bridge in Lucerne (Switzerland) crossing the river Reuss is largely destroyed by fire, together with two-thirds of the 147 17th-century interior paintings by Hans Heinrich Wägmann.

=== Full date unknown ===
- Start of Stone & Man project in Qaqortoq, Greenland: 18 Nordic sculptors led by local artist Aka Høegh carve an initial 24 sculptures into rock faces and boulders around the town.
- The comic book collecting boom achieves its peak.
- The Barbie Liberation Organization, as a revolt against gender stereotypes, switches the voice boxes on a reported 300 talking G.I. Joe and Barbie dolls before returning them to stores.
- A catalogue of Augustan portraits lists 148 replicas of Augustus of Primaporta, plus six done as cameos. The earliest known replica of Augustus is made before 25 BC.
- Duo Yun Xuan holds the first art auction in mainland China.

== Exhibitions ==
- Kustom Kulture, Laguna Beach Art Museum
- Harold Parker retrospective, Queensland Art Gallery
- Venice Biennale shows several works by Young British Artists including Damien Hirst's Mother and Child Divided.

== Awards ==
- Archibald Prize – Garry Shead – "Tom Thompson"
- John Moores Painting Prize – Peter Doig for "Blotter"
- Schock Prize in Visual Arts – Rafael Moneo
- Turner Prize – Rachel Whiteread
- Wolf Prize in Arts – Bruce Nauman—The Venice Biennale--
- The Lion d'or Golden Lion for Best Pavilion: Hans Haacke and Nam June Paik representing Germany

== Works ==
- Jake and Dinos Chapman – "The Disasters of War" after The Disasters of War by Francisco Goya
- Martin Creed – Work No 79: Some Blu-tack kneaded, rolled into a ball and depressed against a wall
- Peter Doig – Blotter
- Elisabeth Frink – Risen Christ (Liverpool Cathedral)
- Anya Gallaccio – Stroke
- Antony Gormley – Iron: Man (Victoria Square, Birmingham, England)
- Joseph Havel – Exhaling Pearls (sculpture, Houston, Texas)
- K Foundation – Money: A Major Body of Cash
- Tobi Kahn – Shalev (shrine at New Harmony, Indiana)
- Roy Lichtenstein – Large Interior with Three Reflections
- Joel Shapiro - Loss and Regeneration- installed at the United States Holocaust Memorial Museum in WDC
- James Stephenson – Joy Selig (sculpture, Corvallis, Oregon)
- John Stanton Ward – The Annunciation (mural, St Mary the Virgin church, Elham, Kent, England)
- Gillian Wearing – Signs that say what you want them to say and not Signs that say what someone else wants you to say
- Rachel Whiteread – House

== Films ==
- Flirting Scholar

== Deaths ==
- 22 January – Brett Weston, American photographer (b. 1911).
- 26 January – Robert Jacobsen, Danish sculptor and painter (b. 1912).
- 28 January – Hannah Wilke, American painter, sculptor and photographer (b. 1940).
- 30 January – Svetoslav Roerich, Russian painter (b. 1904).
- 19 February – Pietro Pezzati, American painter (b. 1902).
- 13 March – José Gómez Abad, Spanish painter (b. 1904).
- 30 March – Richard Diebenkorn, American painter (b. 1922).
- 18 April – Dame Elisabeth Frink, English sculptor (b. 1930).
- 21 April – Rowland Hilder, English landscape painter (b. 1905).
- 3 May – Robert De Niro, Sr., American abstract expressionist painter (b. 1922).
- 20 May – Stevan Bodnarov, Serbian sculptor and painter (b. 1905).
- 30 May – Henry Heerup, Danish painter and sculptor (b. 1907).
- 9 June - Thomas Ammann, Swiss art desler (b. 1950).
- 31 July – Lola Álvarez Bravo, Mexican photographer (b. 1903).
- 6 September – Leonard Bocour, paint-maker, painter (b. 1910).
- 20 October – Milan Konjović, Serbian painter (b. 1898).
- 7 December – Abidin Dino, Turkish artist (b. 1913).
