= Shaking Man =

1993 bronze sculpture by Terry Allen in San Francisco, California, U.S.

- Artist: Terry Allen
- Year: 1993
- Medium: Bronze sculpture
- Subject: Businessman
- Location: San Francisco, California, United States
- 37°47′3.2″N 122°24′9.2″W

Shaking Man is a 1993 bronze sculpture by Terry Allen, installed at Yerba Buena Gardens, in San Francisco's South of Market neighborhood, in the U.S. state of California.

== Description and history ==
The bronze statue depicts an executive wearing business attire, with many of his features duplicated thrice as if he is moving quickly back and forth. It measures approximately 5 ft. 5 in. x 2 ft. 6 in. x 2 ft. 6 in. The sculpture's plaque reads: "Shaking Man / Terry Allen / 1993 / Collection of the / San Francisco Redevelopment Agency."

Shaking Man was completed in October 1993, and surveyed by the Smithsonian Institution's "Save Outdoor Sculpture!" program in 1993.

== See also ==
- 1993 in art
