= Twelve Landscape Screens =

1925 paintings by Qi Baishi

- 山水十二條屏 (Chinese)
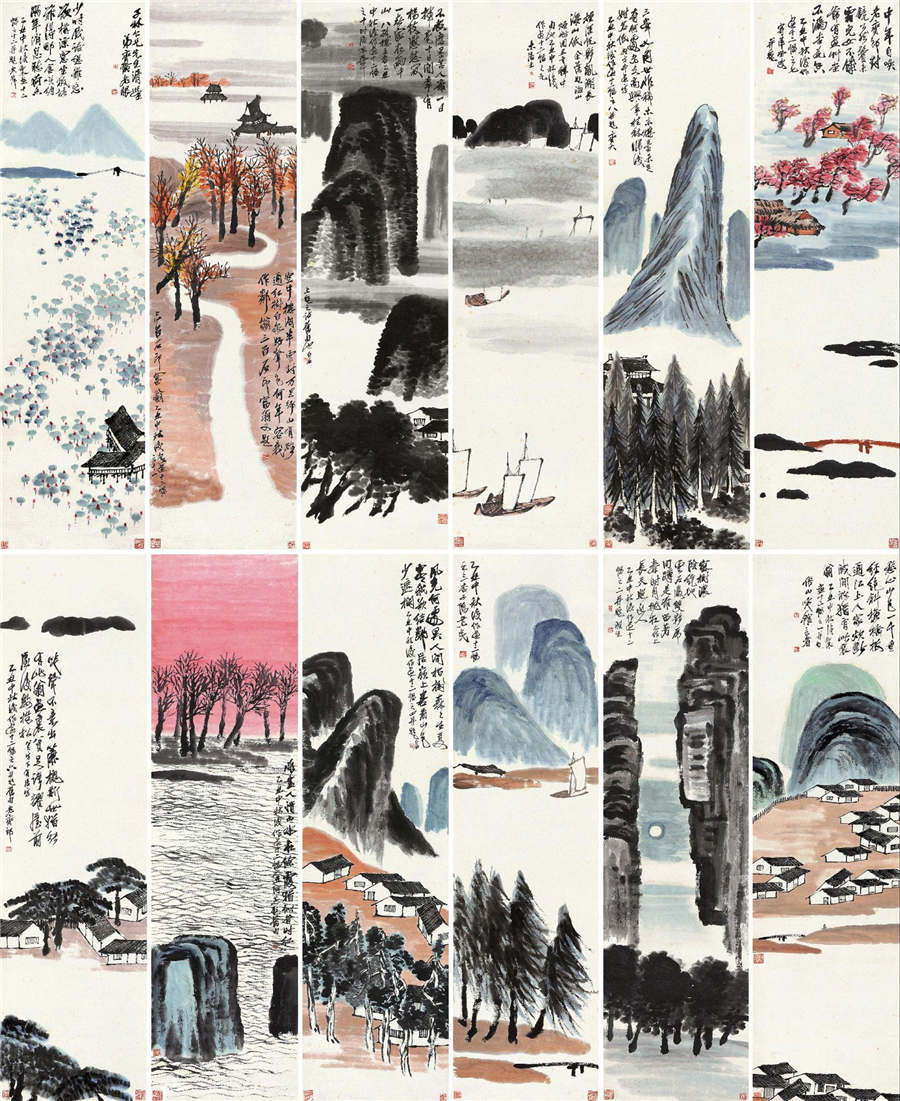
- Artist: Qi Baishi
- Year: 1925
- Medium: Hanging scroll; ink brush on silk
- Movement: Modern Chinese
- Dimensions: 180 cm × 47 cm (71 in (Note: Measurements for a singular panel.) × 18.5 in)
- Location: Private collection

Twelve Landscape Screens (traditional Chinese: 山水十二條屏; simplified Chinese: 山水十二条屏) is a set of ink wash panels painted by Qi Baishi in 1925, depicting rural Chinese villages alongside mountains and trees across the four seasons in a year. The panels were sold at auction for US$140.8 million in 2017, making them the most expensive non-Western paintings ever sold.

== Description ==
Each of the twelve panels are 180cm long and 47cm wide and have individual titles. (Note: Titles from left-to-right, top-to-bottom as pictured: "Lotus Fragrance in a Plank Pond"; "Red Trees and White Springs"; "Spring Rain in the Mountains"; "Sailing Shadows in Deep Mist"; "Fir Trees and Pavilions"; "Apricot Blossom Thatched Cottage"; "White Houses Under Pine Trees"; "Afterglow on the Distant Shore"; "Dense Cypress Trees"; "Lone Sail on a Plank Bridge"; "Double Reflections on Rocky Cliffs"; "Riverside Dwellings") They illustrate natural scenery, primarily using soft pinks, browns and blues. Scenery in the paintings was inspired by Qi Baishi's travels throughout rural China, while the depictions of houses were inspired by Qi's own village in Hunan.

Each individual panel features Qi's signature seal carvings, as well as an accompanying poem written in calligraphy.

== History ==
The panels were painted in 1925 while Qi was living in Beijing, and were a birthday gift to Chen Zilin, a prominent Beijing-based physician and personal friend. Ten of the twelve panels were publicly displayed in 1954 by the China Artists Association, which Qi led at the time. After his death in 1957, the China Artists Association and the Ministry of Culture displayed all twelve panels in a 1958 posthumous exhibition. The paintings were then secretly given to Xiuyi Guo, a fellow artist and pupil of Qi, who went on to keep them in Taiwan for multiple decades. From the 1980s to the 2010s, Twelve Landscape Screens was held by a private collector.

The panels were originally scheduled to be sold in 2015 by Poly Auction, with a price guide of US$115–217 million, but the sale was called off for undisclosed reasons.

=== Second set ===
In 1932, Qi painted an additional set of the Twelve Landscape Screens and gifted it to Wang Zuanxu, a Kuomintang general. That set is currently housed at the Three Gorges Museum in Chongqing, and was displayed prior to the sale of the original panels.

=== Sale in 2017 ===
On December 17, 2017, Twelve Landscape Screens sold for US$140.8 million with Poly Auction in Beijing. As of 2026, it is the highest price ever paid for a painting by an Asian artist. It also made Qi the first Chinese artist whose work has been sold for more than US$100 million at auction.

A representative for the auction house revealed that almost all of the bidders were from Mainland China, including the buyer, but declined to share further information about their identity. The paintings are currently housed in a private collection.
