= Li Kuchan =

Chinese painter (1899–1983)

- Born: Liying; January 11, 1899 gaotang，shandong
- Died: June 11, 1983 (aged 84); China
- Other names: Ying Jie; courtesy name Chaosan; Ligon; Buddhist name Kuchan
- Occupation: painter

Li Kuchan (Chinese: 李苦禅; January 11, 1899 – June 11, 1983), originally named Ying Jie, later changed to Ying, courtesy name Chaosan, later changed to Ligon, and Buddhist name Kuchan, was a Chinese painter. He was born in Gaotang, Shandong.

== Life ==
Li Kuchan was born into a poor peasant family in Gaotang County, Shandong Province. In 1918, he met the painter Xu Beihong and was taught Western painting techniques. In 1922, he enrolled in the Western Painting Department of the National Art Specialized School in Beiping (now Beijing).

In 1923, Li Kuchan became the first disciple of Qi Baishi. From then on, he embarked on the path of exploring the integration of Chinese and Western art to reform traditional Chinese painting. Under the careful guidance of Qi Baishi, his artistic skills improved significantly in 1924. Later, he founded the "Nine Friends Art Society" at the National Art Specialized School, with the nine friends being Li Kuchan, Wang Xuetao, Wang Zhongnian, Xu Peixia, Sun Gongfu, He Jixiang, Yan Ailan, Yan Bolong, and Yuan Zhongyi. In the 1930s and 1940s, he, along with Jiang Yunong, Wang Qingfang, and Bai Duozhai, were collectively known as the "Four Eccentrics of Beijing".

In 1931, Li Kuchan began teaching at the National Art Specialized School in Hangzhou. In the fall of 1934, he held a solo exhibition in Shanghai. In 1935, he participated in the "December 9th" patriotic demonstration in Shanghai. During the summer, he reunited with Zhang Daqian in Beiping (now Beijing). In 1936, facing personal challenges, he divorced from Ling Meilin and changed his courtesy name to Ligon. He presented the painting "Qing Gong Tu" to Wang Senran, and Qi Baishi inscribed, "Ying also surpasses me."

From July 5 to 7, 1941, he held an exhibition in Zhongshan Park, Beiping, showcasing more than 50 works. In 1946, he was appointed as a professor of traditional Chinese painting at the National Art Specialized School in Beiping by the school's president, Xu Beihong. He was also elected as the executive director of the inaugural Chinese Artists Association.

In 1949, Li Kuchan, along with other cultural figures such as He Siyuan and Xu Beihong, played a role in mediating with the Communist Party for the peaceful liberation of Beiping, emphasizing the need to protect the cultural heritage and the safety of people's lives and property.

After the founding of the People's Republic of China, Li Kuchan held various positions, including professor in the Chinese painting department at the Central Academy of Fine Arts, executive committee member of the China Artists Association, and National Committee member of the Chinese People's Political Consultative Conference. During the Cultural Revolution, especially during the "Black Painting Incident" movement, he faced criticism and persecution.

Li Kuchan died suddenly due to a heart attack on June 11, 1983, at the age of 86.

== Art achievement ==
Li Kuchan in the history of freehand flower-and-bird painting in China, has emerged as a master following the footsteps of artists such as Fa Chang, Xu Wenlong, Ba Da Shan Ren, Wu Changshuo, and Qi Baishi.

Li Kuchan advocated the principle that "the pinnacle of calligraphy leads to painting, and the ultimate in painting involves calligraphy."
