= Huang Yongyu =

Chinese painter (1924–2023)

- 黄永玉
- Pronunciation: Huáng Yǒngyù
- Born: August 4, 1924; Fenghuang, Hunan, China
- Died: June 13, 2023 (aged 98)
- Occupations: Scholar, painter, professor
- Spouse: Zhang Meixi (m. 1985)
- Relatives: Shen Congwen (uncle)

Huang Yongyu (Chinese: 黄永玉; pinyin: Huáng Yǒngyù; August 9, 1924 – June 13, 2023), pen name Huang Xing Bin, Huang Niu, Niu Fuzi, was a scholar of the Tujia ethnicity from Fenghuang, Hunan province, Chinese painter, and former professor of the Central Academy of Fine Arts.

== Biography ==
Huang Yongyu was born on August 9, 1924. Born into poverty, he began working at 12 years old in porcelain workshops in the mountainous areas of Anhui and Fujian, before later moving to Shanghai, Taiwan, and then Hong Kong. At the age of 14, he began to publish works. At the age of 16, he earned a living by painting and wood carving.

While in Hong Kong, he worked in Ta Kung Pao alongside Jin Yong as the art editor.

Huang Yongyu returned to Beijing with his wife Zhang Meixi in 1952 and began working in the Central Academy of Fine Arts as a professor before becoming vice chairman of the Chinese Artists Association. In 1956, the Huang Yongyu Wood Carving Collection was published which contained carvings like Spring Tide and Ashma.

During the Cultural Revolution, especially during the black painting campaign, the Gang of Four accused Yongyu of being a reactionary academic. His painting Owl was among the Black Painting Exhibition, which was characterized by critics as "one of the best counter-revolutionary black paintings." Huang's depictions of owls (which in Chinese lore are "evil") had one eye closed. His opponents contended that this symbolized doubts about China's political system, which Huang denied. After the smashing of the Gang of Four, Huang was open about the fact that his owl paintings were a form of political protest.

Huang Yongyu held numerous painting exhibitions in Australia, Germany, Italy, mainland China and Hong Kong, and his artistic achievements are well known at home and abroad. He received awards from the Italian government for his contributions in the cultural exchange between China and Italy. His works were exhibited in Hong Kong Times Square in July 2007.

== Works ==
Yongyu's art includes printmaking, paintings, sculptures, literature, architecture, and stamp design. His paintings are a blend of Western and Chinese style. Huang Yongyu was also an accomplished poet, his poems being described as colloquial and simple yet emotionally touching.

His stamp work includes the zodiac Golden Monkey stamp, and notable literature include Yongyu Six Records, Wu Shimang Forum, Wife, Don't Cry, These Melancholy Debris, Along the Seine River to Fei Leng Cui, Landscape under the Sun, The Wandering Man of the Wucho River. He was an architect in various projects, such as Yu's Mountain House, Zhuang Cuilou in Phoenix County, Half House in the Mountain in Hong Kong, Wan He Tang in Tongzhou, Beijing, and Innumerable Villa in Florence, Italy.

The Chinese logo of the clothing brand Giordano was inscribed by Huang Yongyu. In addition, a brand logo for wine was designed by Huang Yongyu.

In November 2017, his 11-foot (3.4 m) ink on paper scroll, Autumn Scenery (1978), brought $2.5 million (HKD 19.3 million) at an auction at Christie's.

== Honors ==
For the 2008 Summer Olympics, Huang Yongyu created an art piece to celebrate China hosting the Olympics that year. On August 24, 2008, then President of the International Olympic Committee Jacques Rogge and vice president He Zhenliang awarded Yongyu the Olympic Art Award for the piece, the first Chinese national to win it.

Yongyu received 3 awards from Italy, including the Medal of Meritorious Commander of the Italian Republic (December 27, 1985), the Medal of Commander of the Italian Unity Star (announced May 30, 2005, awarded in Beijing March 14, 2006), and the Italian Star Knight's Grand Cross (announced May 24, 2019, awarded in Beijing May 20, 2021).

== Controversy ==
On September 8, 2022, the stamp Year of Gui Mao was released, designed by Huang Yongyu. China Post described it as "a wise rabbit with a pen in his right hand and a letter in his left hand in an ingenious blue color, as if it were conveying New Year good wishes to the people." However, after its release, people online claimed the rabbit looked "demonic" and was not cute enough. Some people praised the design, such as painter Han Meilin who applauded the stamp's novelty and bold design. Hong Xinliang, Qianjiang Evening News commentator, did not blame Huang Yongyu, and that the committee who approved the stamp's publication should have publicized the stamp in advance to be checked by the audience. The stamp drew crowds to post offices and sold out online.

On January 5, 2023, at an event sponsored by China Post and the Guangxi Zhuang Autonomous Region Museum in Nanning, Guangxi, a mascot based on the rabbit appeared at the venue which aroused complaints from people online. Guangxi Museum said that they had received feedback from parents about the mascot and it was removed.
