= Large Interior with Three Reflections =

Painting by Roy Lichtenstein

- Artist: Roy Lichtenstein
- Year: 1993
- Movement: Pop art

Large Interior with Three Reflections is a 1993 pop art painting by Roy Lichtenstein.

== See also ==
- 1993 in art
