= Zong Qixiang =

Chinese painter (1917–1999)

- Born: 1917; China
- Died: 1999 (aged 81–82)
- Education: National Central University
- Known for: Painting

In this Chinese name, the family name is Zong.

Zong Qixiang (Chinese: 宗其香; pinyin: zōng qí xiāng; 1917 – 29 December 1999) was a Chinese painter and a disciple of Xu Beihong.

== Life and career ==
Born in Nanjing, Jiangsu in 1917. In 1943, he graduated from the Art Department of National Central University. In 1946, he followed Xu Beihong to Beiping as a lecturer at the National Beiping Art College. After 1953, he served as a professor of the Central Academy of Fine Arts, director of the teaching and research section of watercolor painting, and director of the landscape department of the Department of Chinese Painting. Member of China Artists Association.
