= Zhang Xian (poet) =

Zhang Xian (Chinese: 张先; pinyin: Zhāng Xiān; 990–1078) was a Song Dynasty artist in China.

He created Ten Odes based on Zhang Wei's own "ten beloved poems written on white silk."

Zhang Xian's Illustrating Ten Poems (Shiyong tu) (Song dynasty) now are in the Palace Museum collection.

According to the Chinese Tour Guide website:

They were spirited out of the palace by Puyi on the excuse of bestowing them on his brother Pujie; they fell into the hands of others and it was not until the 1990s were they returned to their rightful place in the Palace Museum collections.
