= José Gómez Abad =

Spanish painter (1904–1993)

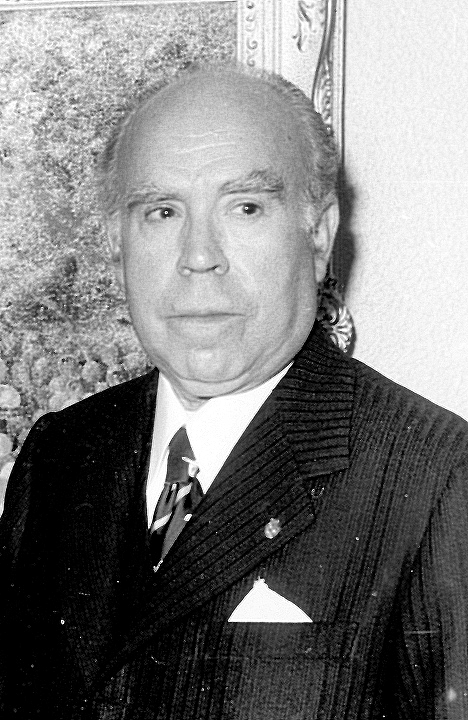
- Born: January 29, 1904; Pechina, Andalusia, Spain
- Died: March 13, 1993 (aged 89)
- Occupation: Painter
- Movement: Indaliano

José Gómez Abad (29 January 1904 – 13 March 1993) was a Spanish painter.

== Biography and career ==
José Gómez Abad showed a precocious talent for painting from an early age. At the age of eleven, he enrolled at an art academy in the historic district of Almería and at the Escuela de Artes (where he later became a teacher), although he was self-taught throughout his life.

=== Artistic development ===
In 1941, he traveled to Barcelona with six paintings, which he exhibited at the Layetana Gallery. The sale of these paintings enabled him to fully dedicate himself to painting. Subsequent exhibitions in Almería featured themes such as still lifes, flowers, and landscapes. By the 1940s, he already had substantial support in Barcelona, allowing him to exhibit frequently at venues like the Sala Augusta and the Layetana gallery. He organized numerous exhibitions in Barcelona, Almería, and other Spanish cities, earning recognition, including a prize at the National Drawing Exhibition in Granada in 1944.

=== Engagement Indaliano ===
In 1946, he joined the Indaliano Movement at the invitation of Jesús de Perceval. The first Indaliano Congress took place in 1947 in Pechina, his hometown, leading to the foundation of the Academia Indaliana Artes y Bellas Letras de Almería. He also participated in the inaugural Indaliana exhibition at the Museo de Arte Moderno in Madrid in 1947.

=== Recognition and awards ===
Throughout the fifties, sixties, and seventies, he alternately exhibited in Barcelona, Almeria, and occasionally in Bilbao, Zaragoza, Vitoria, Granada, etc. Exhibitions of his work at the Harvy Gallery or the Casino in Almeria were successful, earning him widespread recognition. In 1990, the Pechina Town Council appointed him "hijo predilecto" (favorite son). In 1991, he was awarded the fourth Jesús de Perceval Prize for Visual Arts and Architecture, organized by the Casa de Almería in Barcelona.

== Style ==
An artist whose training and style were largely self-taught, he took an interest in still lifes and became known as the "grape painter". From an early age and throughout his life, he was also fascinated by the rural environment, which he depicted in paintings of the farmhouses of Andarax, the district of La Chanca, the landscape of Níjar and the Tabernas Desert. As a curiosity, he painted two bullfighting costumes and a Virgen de la Mar for the businessman José Artés de Arcos.

== Bibliography ==
- Caparrós Masegosa, Mª Dolores: Las exposiciones de bellas artes celebradas en Almería y la prensa local (1900-1935), available on the website Diputación Provincial de Almería.
- Cerdera, Alberto F. : "El arte de la burguesía almeriense del XIX", article published in Novapolis.es. 5 May 2010.
- García Bellver, J. : Perceval, Viciana, Gómez Abad et Garzolini. Yugo, Almería : 1947.
- Navarro Pérez, Luis : "Cien almerienses (síntesis biográfica de dichos y hechos)", monograph published in la Revista de Humanidades y Sociales del Instituto de Estudios Almerienses (IEA), 17 (1999-2000), p. 331-338 331-338. Available on the Diputación Provincial de Almería.
- La UAL y la Diputación presentan una exposición sobre los maestros del Realismo, article published in Diezencultura.es 29 April
- Burguesía artística almeriense, article published in Ideal on 4 May 2010.
- José Gómez Abad in Los cien almerienses del siglo XX Archivé le 28 maie 2010 in the Wayback Machine, in the newspaper Idéal.
- Works by José Gómez Abad sold at auction by Arcadja Auctions.
