= Beijing Library =

Municipal public library in Tongzhou, Beijing, China

- 北京城市图书馆
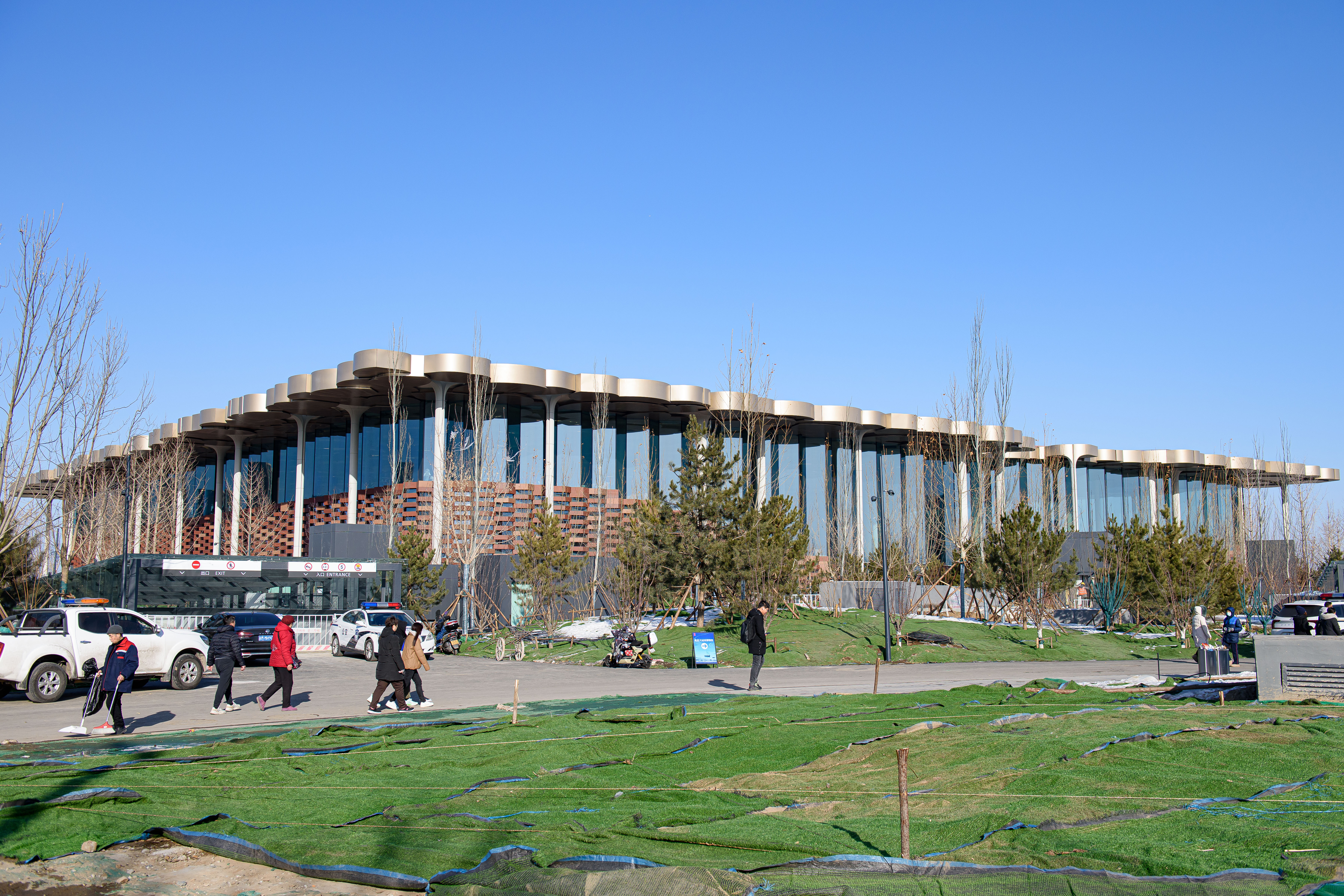
- Beijing Library (December 2023)
- 39.8829°N 116.7085°E
- Location: North side of Urban Green Heart Forest Park, Tongzhou District, Beijing
- Type: Library
- Established: December 27, 2023

Other information
- Website: bjlib.clcn.net.cn

Beijing Library (北京城市图书馆) is located north of the Central Green Forest Park in Tongzhou, Beijing, and is one of the three major buildings in the Beijing Municipal Administrative Center. It was completed and opened on December 27, 2023, forming the "One Library, Three Locations" pattern with the Hua Wei Qiao branch and the Daxing Airport branch of Capital Library. The Library houses functional areas such as ancient literature and documents, intangible cultural heritage, open-stack reading areas, smart libraries, and lecture halls, providing reading and learning facilities. In 2025 it had over 2.81 million visitors.

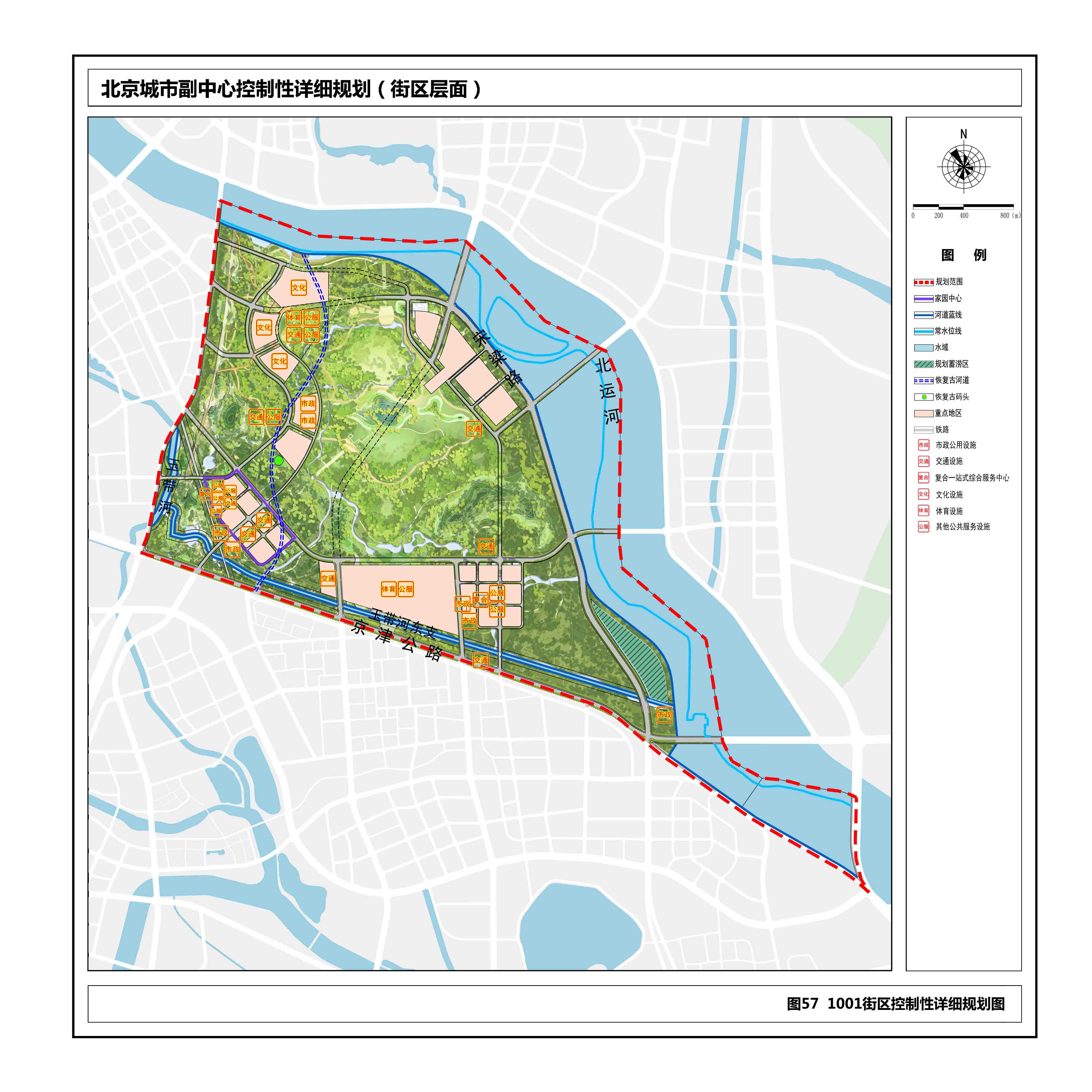
Beijing Urban Sub-center Control Detailed Plan (Block Level) (2016-2035) 1001 Block Plan

== Structure ==
The total building area of Beijing Library is approximately 75,000 square meters. The design concept is derived from the traditional Chinese cultural symbol "Red Seal." From a high altitude, the square and red architectural shape resembles a jade seal imprinting on the scroll of Central Green Forest Park. From the interior looking up, various-shaped ginkgo leaves create a forest canopy on the roof, providing a natural environment for people walking beneath it.

== Construction ==
With a total investment of 1.415 billion RMB, it was built by Beijing Investment Group Co., Ltd., and constructed by China Railway Construction Group Co., Ltd., with a contract amount of 1.187 billion RMB. The construction of the three major buildings started at the end of October 2019 and had emerged from the ground before the Spring Festival in 2021. The completion of the exterior is expected by the end of 2021, and the overall completion is expected by the end of 2022.

It was officially opened on December 27, 2023.
