= V-Continent Beijing Parkview Wuzhou Hotel =

Hotel in Beijing, China

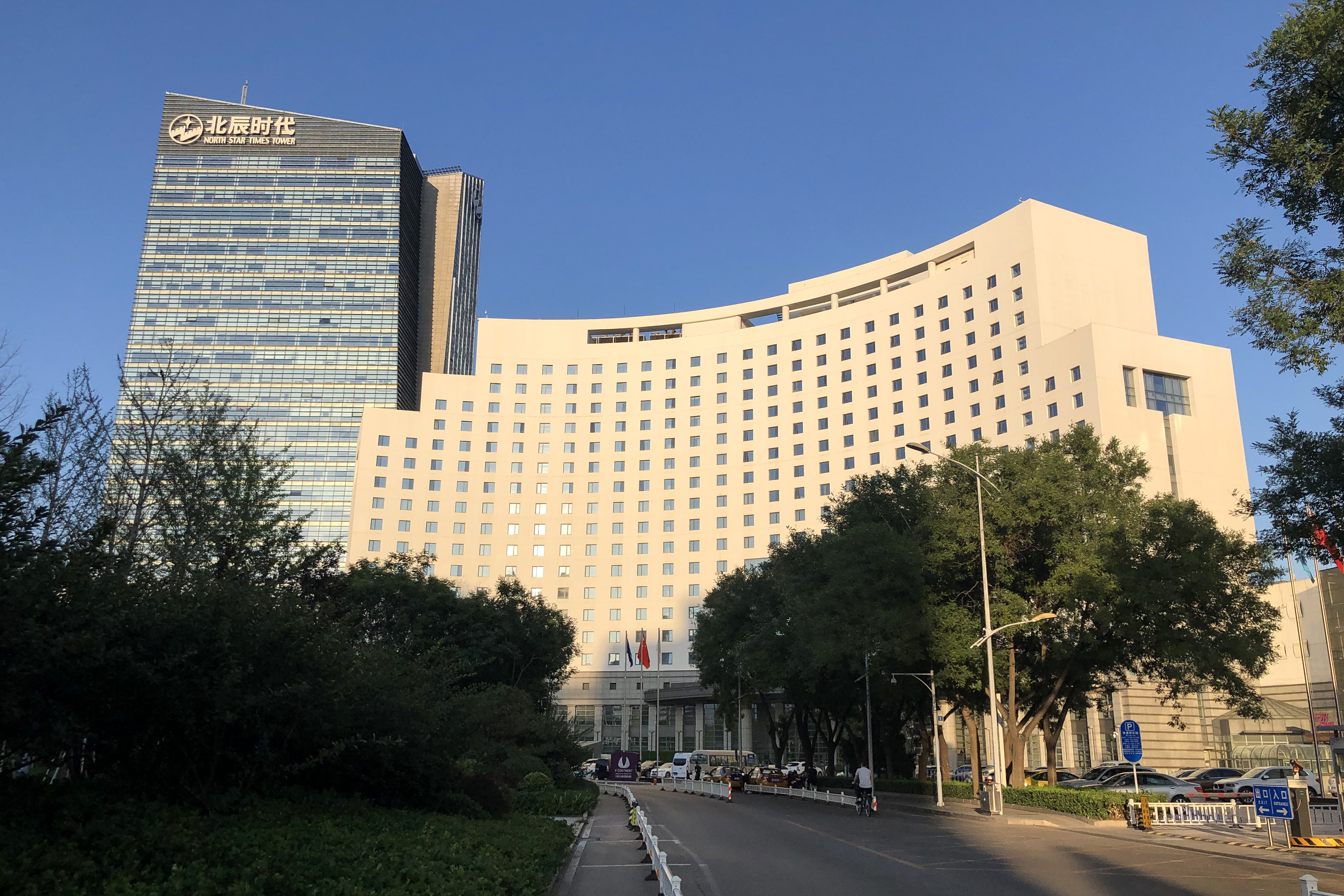
- Interactive map of the V-Continent Beijing Parkview Wuzhou Hotel area

General information
- Type: Hotel
- Location: Beijing, China
- Coordinates: 39.988659°N 116.399178°E

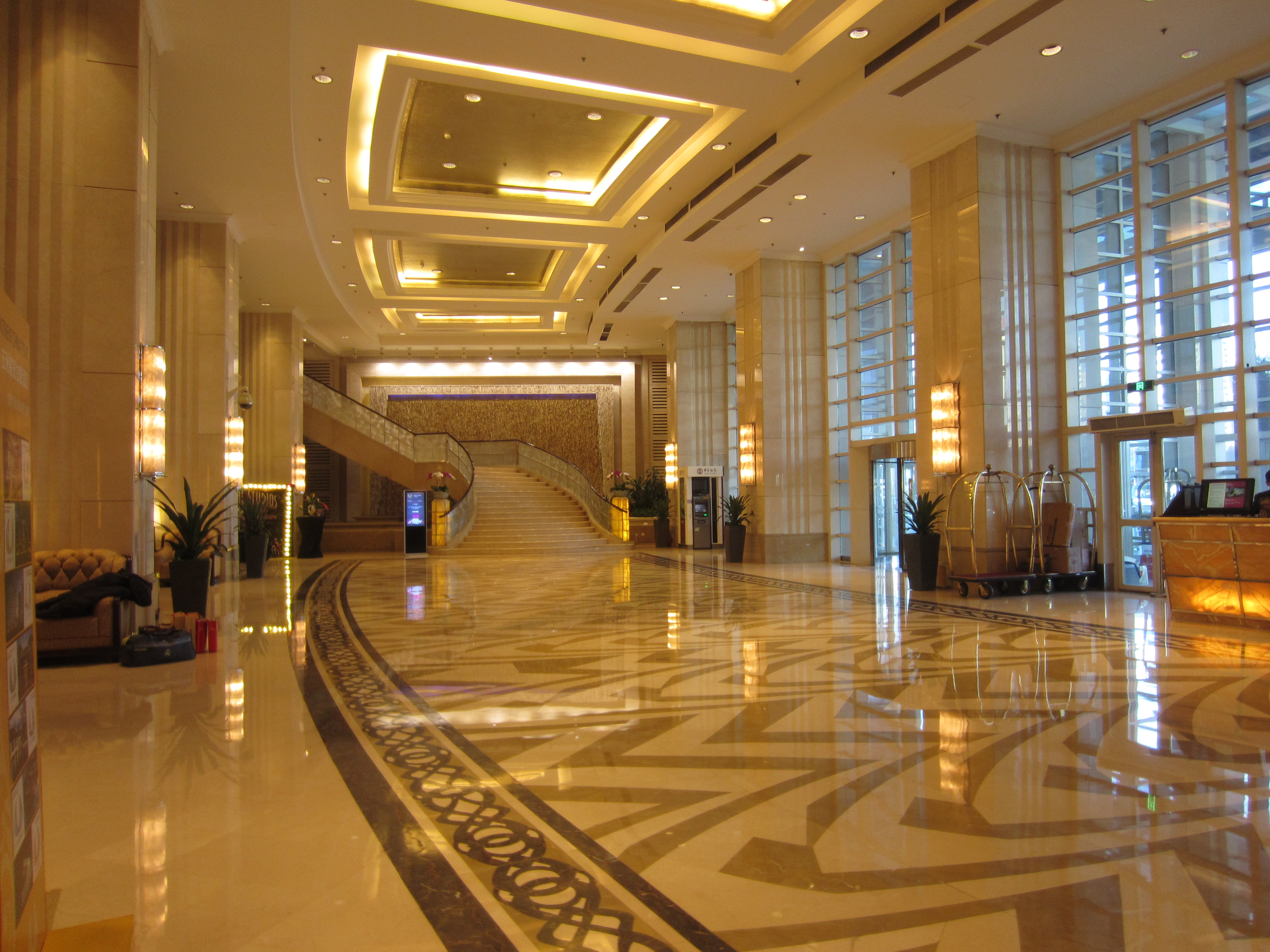
Lobby interior, 2016

V-Continent Beijing Parkview Wuzhou Hotel is a hotel in Beijing, China.

The predecessor of the hotel was the Crowne Plaza Beijing Wuzhou. On October 20, 2013, the 10-year management contract between Beijing Beichen Industrial Co., Ltd. and InterContinental Hotel Group expired. On October 21, 2013, Crowne Plaza Beijing Wuzhou changed its name to Crown International Hotel Beijing Wuzhou, which means that the owner of the hotel, Beijing Beichen Industrial Co., Ltd., will independently manage the hotel. During the 2014 China APEC Summit, the hotel was one of the hotels recommended by the host to journalists.
