= Li Keran =

Chinese guohua painter and art educator

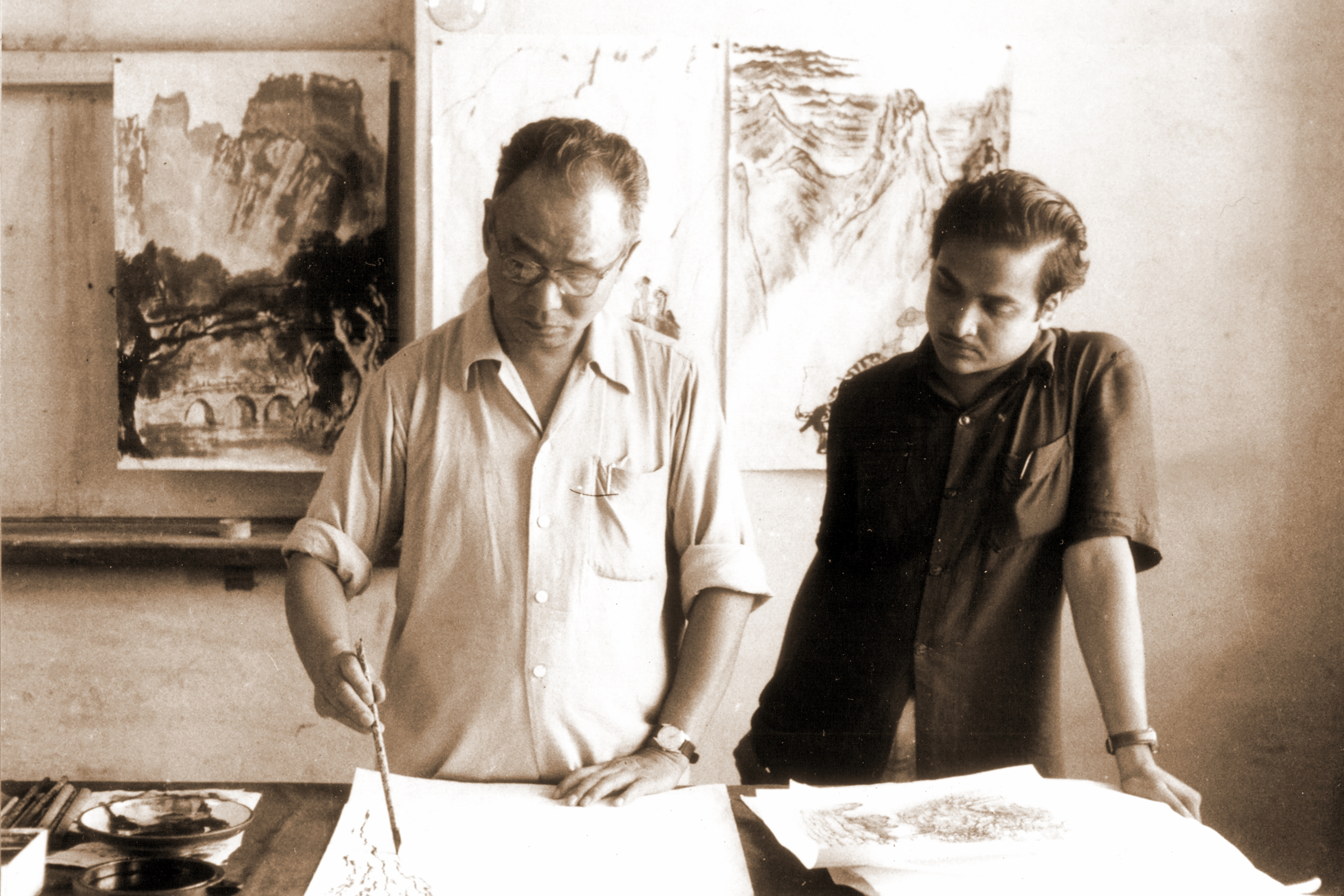
- Li Keran and Beohar Rammanohar Sinha in 1957
- Born: Li Yongshun; 26 March 1907; Xuzhou, Jiangsu, China
- Died: 5 December 1989 (aged 82); Beijing, China
- Known for: Literati painting
- Notable work: Landscape in Red (seven versions), Magnificent Mountains With Gushy Cascades, Shaoshan, Long March

Chinese name
- Chinese: 李可染
Transcriptions
Standard Mandarin
- Hanyu Pinyin: Lǐ Kěrǎn
- Wade–Giles: Li K'o-jan

Li Keran (Chinese: 李可染; Wade–Giles: Li K'o-jan; 26 March 1907 – 5 December 1989), art name Sanqi, was a contemporary Chinese guohua painter and art educator. Considered one of the most important Chinese artists in the latter half of the 20th century, he was also an influential professor at the Central Academy of Fine Arts where he taught a generation of Chinese artists. Although trained in Western oil painting, he was known for his traditional literati paintings with influences from Qi Baishi and Huang Binhong, two renowned masters in Chinese painting.

Li's paintings are highly valued at auctions, with several fetching hundreds of millions of yuan. His personal auction record was set by Thousands of Hills in a Crimsoned View (also translated as Landscape in Red), one of his most celebrated works, which sold for CN¥293.25 million (US$46 million) in June 2012.

== Biography ==
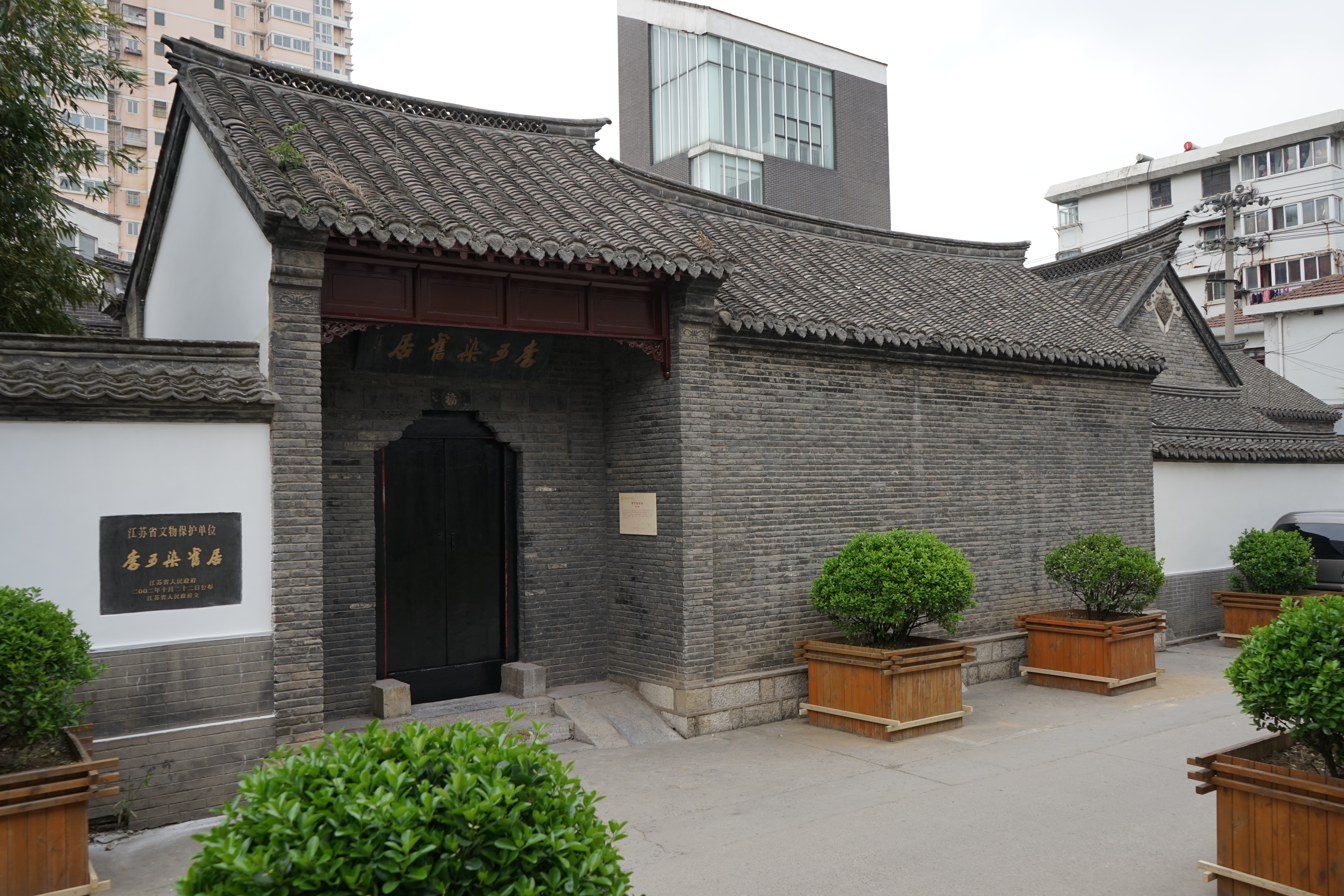
Former Residence of Li Keran in Xuzhou

Li was born Li Yongshun (李永顺) on 26 March 1907 in Xuzhou, Jiangsu province; his parents were illiterate.

He showed a talent in art from an early age, and studied painting from Qian Shizhi, a local painter. He enrolled in Shanghai Art Academy in 1923. After graduating in 1925, he returned to Xuzhou and worked as a teacher.

In 1929, Li entered National Academy of Arts in Hangzhou for graduate studies in Western art. There, he studied oil painting under the president Lin Fengmian and the French professor André Claudot. In 1931, he joined the Eighteen Art Society (or Yiba Art Society, 一八艺社), which was closed by the government for its leftism. Since the postgraduate school of the academy was defunct, he had to leave, along with other members, in the next year. He went back and taught in Xuzhou again.

During the Second Sino-Japanese War, Li worked for the Nationalist government, creating many anti-Japanese posters and murals for war propaganda. He became a lecturer in Chinese painting at the National Academy of Arts exiled in Chongqing, in 1943. His talent was appreciated by Xu Beihong, who invited him to teach at the National Beiping Art School in 1946. He was mentored by the renowned traditional artists Qi Baishi and Huang Binhong at the academy.

In 1954, Li, Zhang Ding and Luo Ming teamed up for a three-months tour in the lower Yangtze, created some landscape paintings on-site. The tour attracted significant attention from other prominent artists, critics, and art collectives. The artists sought to use guohua to depict socialist life in a way consistent with principles of materialism. Li had another longer tour among southern China since the summer of 1956, he finished more paintings meantime which are significant for the contemporary Chinese paintings. The works illustrating Mao Zedong's poems had been mainstream in mainland China since the 1950s, Liupanshan was Li's first step into that, and his style changed afterward. His celebrated painting, Wan Shan Hong Bian (万山红遍, Thousands of Hills in a Crimsoned View, also translated as Landscape in Red), which influenced many Chinese landscape painters, was completed in 1964.

During the Cultural Revolution, Li was severely criticized for his signature style, the black landscape paintings. After the end of the revolution, he resumed painting and was appointed as the first president of China National Academy of Painting in 1979. In later life Li had many followers, who formed the "Li School" of the 1980s.

Li innovated Chinese landscape painting by integrating native and western techniques, inasmuch as he was inspired by Rembrandt's chiaroscuro. By introducing shadowing, he developed "backlighting landscape". Besides, he also advocates the practice of sketching or painting from nature on-site.

Li is also noted for the enlivened water buffaloes in his paintings. His calligraphy is deemed to be distinctive, and he is also a competent huqin player.

== Art market ==
Li Keran is one of the most valued Chinese artists in art market. In May 2012, his painting Shaoshan, which depicts Mao Zedong's former residence in Shaoshan, was sold by China Guardian Auction for CN¥124 million, breaking his previous record of 107 million set by the painting Long March.

Wan Shan Hong Bian (Thousands of Hills in a Crimsoned View, or Landscape in Red), Li's 1964 masterpiece inspired by Mao's famous poem "Changsha", was sold at Poly Auction in June 2012 for a personal record price of CN¥293.25 million (US$46 million). It was the largest of seven versions Li painted between 1961 and 1964. In 2015, the smallest version of the seven was sold by China Guardian for CN¥184 million. The painting had been acquired for just 80 yuan forty years earlier by Beijing's Rong Bao Zhai, which sold it in 2000 for 5 million yuan.

In October 2017, Li's Magnificent Mountains With Gushy Cascades was sold at Sotheby's Hong Kong auction for HK$122 million (US$15.6 million).

== Personal life ==
Li married Su E in 1931, and they had four children. After Su died in 1938, he remarried sculptor Zou Peizhu in 1944. They had another three children. Li died on 5 December 1989 from a heart attack.
