= Duo Yun Xuan =

Chinese auction company

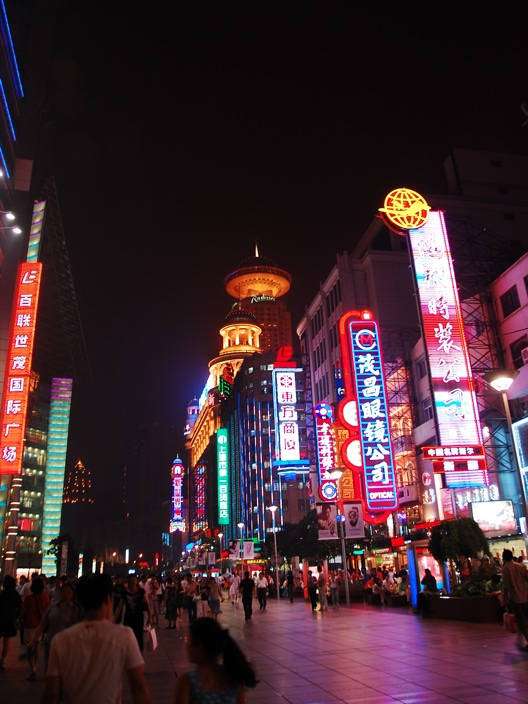
Duo Yun Xuan is located on Nanjing East Road in Shanghai

Duo Yun Xuan (simplified Chinese: 朵云轩; traditional Chinese: 朵雲軒; pinyin: Duǒ Yún Xuān) is an art dealer and auction house, which was founded in Shanghai in 1900. It is located on Nanjing East Road in Shanghai. Duo Yun Xuan was the first company to hold art auctions in mainland China.

== Activities ==
Duo Yun Xuan is an art institution dedicated to purchasing, distributing, publishing, and collecting fine art, including calligraphy and paintings. It is located in an old stationery, calligraphy and painting shop in Shanghai, China. Art exhibitions and academic events are hosted here via partnerships with calligraphers, painters and engravers.

== Contributions and influence ==
The Chinese Ministry of Commerce has endorsed Duo Yun Xuan as the first art auction house established in mainland China.

In 1978, Duo Yun Xuan formed the Shanghai Painting and Calligraphy Publishing House and began publishing fine art, among other activities. In the 1980s, it became a leading firm in Shanghai's art industry. Nine years later, the woodblock watermark work The Ming Ten Bamboo House Painting and Calligraphy Book (明十竹齋書畫譜), published by Duo Yun Xuan, won the "National Award" at the Leipzig International Book Art Fair in Germany.

In 1993, Duo Yun Xuan held its first art auction, which was also the first art auction in mainland China. In 2006, it was recognized by the Ministry of Commerce as one of the earliest "time-honored brands" in China. The woodblock watermarking technique preserved by Duo Yun Xuan was listed as part of Shanghai's intangible cultural heritage in 2006 and a piece of national intangible cultural heritage in 2008. Its woodblock watermarking tradition is recognized by the Ministry of Culture as a good example of preserving cultural heritage.

In 2010, during the Shanghai World Expo, Duo Yun Xuan exhibited the eight-year-old crafted woodblock watermark Happy Birthday to the Immortals (群仙祝壽圖), and arranged the "Duo Yun Xuan Painted Boat" for the Expo Garden. In October 2010, its woodblock watermark work Orchid and Bamboo (幽蘭叢竹圖) won the gold medal at the first Chinese Intangible Cultural Heritage Expo.
