= Lu Yanshao =

Lu Yanshao (Chinese: 陸儼少; 1909–1993) was a Chinese painter. In 1927 he followed Wang Tongyu to study poetry and calligraphy, then the Shanghai painter Feng Chaoran became Lu's advisor. Lu had to live for a time in remote mountainous areas because of Japanese invasion of China in 1930s. In 1938 he held his exhibition for the first time. In 1955 he began to work for Chinese Painting Academy in Shanghai. His career silenced during the Cultural Revolution, until the 1970s. Lu inherited the skill of Four Wangs, favoured building brushstrokes spontaneously rather than following outlines.
