= Qi Baishi =

Chinese painter (1864–1957)

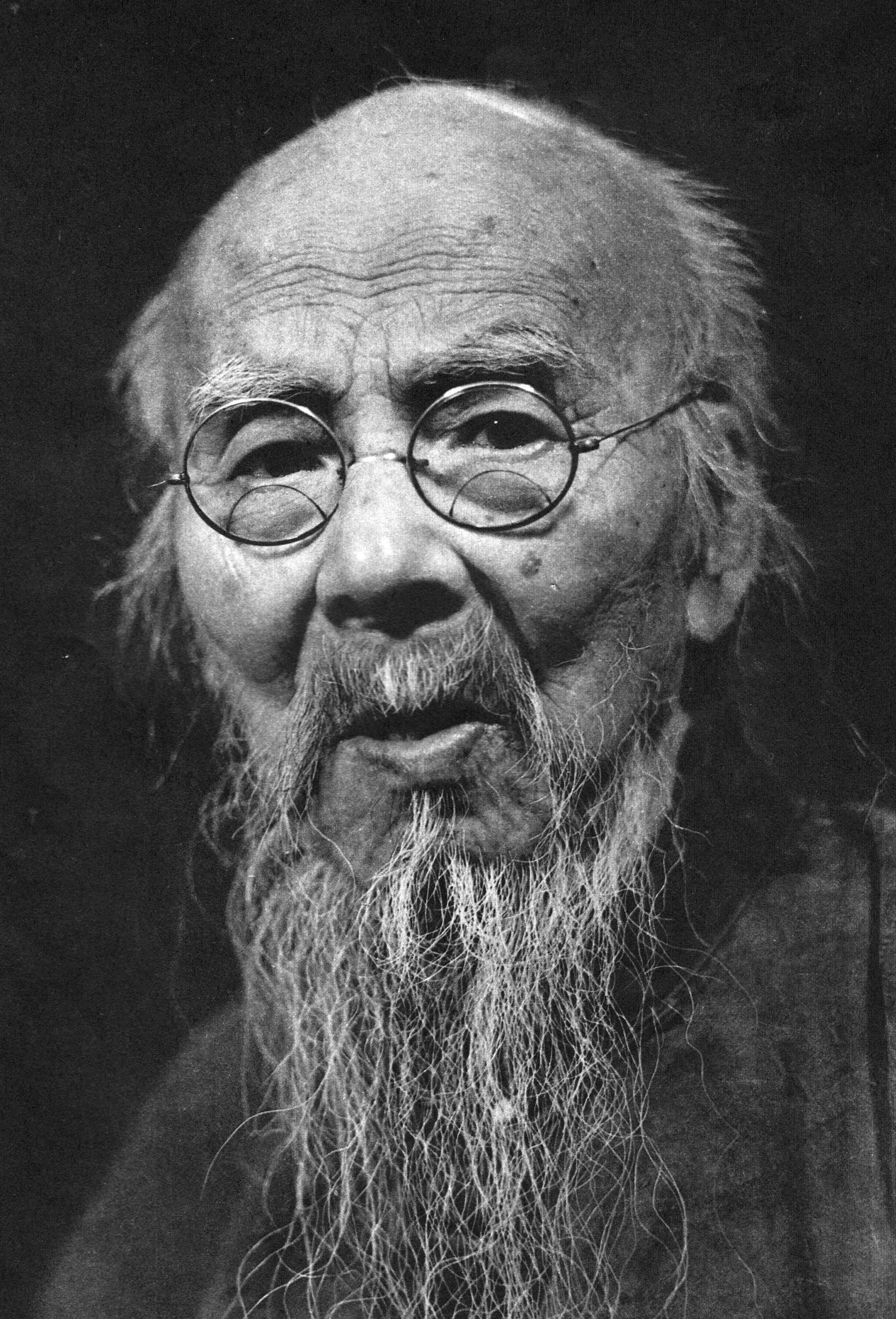
- Photo portrait of Qi Baishi in 1956
- Born: Qi Chunzhi (齊純芝); 1 January 1864; Xiangtan, Hunan, China
- Died: 16 September 1957 (aged 93); Beijing, China
- Known for: Painting
- Notable work: Twelve Landscape Screens

Chinese name
- Traditional Chinese: 齊白石
- Simplified Chinese: 齐白石
Transcriptions
Standard Mandarin
- Hanyu Pinyin: Qí Báishí
- Wade–Giles: Ch'i2 Pai2-shih2

Qi Baishi (1 January 1864 – 16 September 1957) was a Chinese painter, noted for the whimsical, often playful style of his works. Born to a peasant family from Xiangtan, Hunan, Qi taught himself to paint, sparked by the Manual of the Mustard Seed Garden. After he turned 40, he traveled, visiting various scenic spots in China. After 1917 he settled in Beijing. Qi was the master of Hu Jieqing, the wife of Lao She.

The subjects of his paintings include almost everything, commonly animals, scenery, figures, toys, vegetables, and so on. He theorized that "paintings must be something between likeness and unlikeness, much like today's vulgarians, but not like to cheat popular people". In his later years, many of his works depict mice, shrimp or birds. He was also good at seal carving and called himself "the rich man of three hundred stone seals" (三百石印富翁). In 1953, he was elected president of the China Artists Association (中國美術家協會). He died in Beijing in 1957.

== Early life ==
He was born in Xiangtan, Hunan. He lived with his parents, grandparents, and eight younger sisters and brothers. Qi was schooled for less than a year due to illness. However, he was too weak to do much of the work and this was when he became a carpenter. While Qi was growing up, he read Chinese manual of painting, which sparked his interest in art and painting animals, insects and other types. In his paintings, he depicted things that people have seen, however, he did not start following this motto until much later in his life. He first studied the Manual of the Mustard Seed Garden (芥子園畫傳) and used performers, mainly opera, for models to practice his work. After using opera performers as models, Qi turned to anyone he knew to pose for him.

== Training and education ==
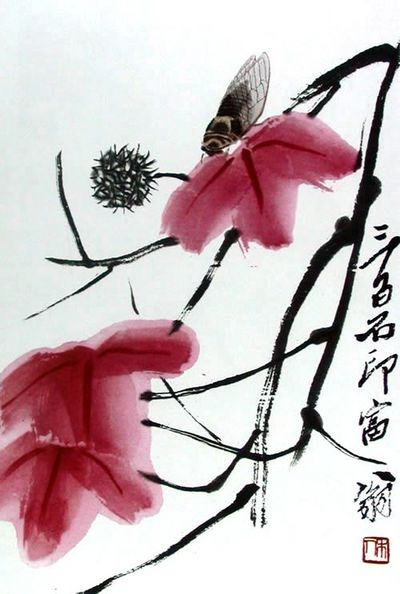
Painting of a cicada by Qi Baishi

"Qi Baishi started receiving artistic training... which consisted of fundamentals in gongbi (工筆) mode, which features fine brushwork and meticulous detail". He was taught that every aspect of painting mattered, from the subject matter to the way the ink was applied to the paper. His landscape paintings came as a result of his next mentor Tan Pu. Because of his training, he then realized that he could pursue art as his full-time career instead of just dreaming to become a professional artist. Despite his training in gongbi, Qi is famed for painting in the freely expressive xieyi (寫意 'sketching thoughts') style.

Qi was popular for his variety of works ranging from plant to animal life; because of his natural style, collectors both "artistic and political" purchased his work. According to the article, Qi Baishi [Ch’i Pai-shih; zi Huang; hao Baishi Laoren, Baishi Shanqeng]: "Qi's works were based on his life and his character. After the fall of the Qing dynasty Qi was known for not letting all the political issues affect his work and keeping his own values and ideas through the harsh times. According to Confucian standards, starting off as nothing and creating a name for yourself, as Qi did, was very honorable.

Qi managed to master many different techniques including calligraphy and seal-carving. After establishing himself in Hunan as a painter and artist, it wasn't until his forties that he began traveling and looking for more inspiration. Qi came upon the Shanghai School, which was very popular at the time, and met Wu Changshuo who then became another mentor to him and inspired a lot of Qi's works. Another influence of Qi didn't come until about fifteen years later who was Chen Shizeng (陳師曾) who he became close to when he was living in Beijing. Qi was becoming more and more well-known and sought after.

While not overtly political, Qi's work in the early 20th century reflected tensions between tradition and modernity. His style evolved to eventually strip away a level of polish associated with more traditional élite Chinese court painting. Yet at the same time, his work translated these traditional folk ideas into a register for an educated urban audience.

Like many other artists and intellectuals, Qi viewed the ascent to power of the Chinese Communist Party in 1949, in the aftermath of the Chinese Civil War, with a degree of fear. He told fellow artist Xu Beihong that he feared for his life if he did not flee the country into exile. When Qi eventually did receive a quasi-formal visit from officials, they expressed admiration for his work. Qi's work in the immediate aftermath of the Chinese Civil War put his own work in a context in line with the May Fourth Movement. For instance, he saw his depictions of farm tools as analogous to working in agricultural labor.

The superficially traditional and apolitical themes of his work largely spared Qi from political interference in contrast to other artists of the period. To the contrary, he received explicit and implicit endorsement from the state and political leaders. His vitality was used in government propaganda, and Mao Zedong collected Qi's work. It was sometimes seen by other artists that Qi's approach served as a model for reconciling artistic freedom with the Chinese political context after the CCP's rise to power.

Qi was "elected to the National People's Congress and made honorary Chairman of the National Artists Association in the early 1950s. He was viewed as representing a continuing commitment to traditional cultural values in revolutionary China". He died at age 93.

== Settling down ==
After all of his travels, Qi built a house and settled down. He began reading and writing poetry and painting some of the mountains he saw while traveling. These paintings became a series of fifty landscape pictures known as "Chieh-shan t'u-chuan." Later, poems and postscripts by artists that Qi knew were printed onto the paintings. One of Qi's earlier series of works called "The Carp" was recognized and praised for its simple style - it contained no excess of decorations or writings. His noticeable talent with wood-carving was also highly praised, as was his ability to express his personal influence through his work. It was not until his mid-fifties that Qi was considered a mature painter. By then, his lines were sharper and his subject matter had changed from wildlife to botany. As said by Wang Chao-Wen, "he based his work on reality while experimenting ceaselessly in new ways of expression, to integrate truth and beauty, create something yet unimagined by other artists, and achieve his own unique style, on that should not be artificial".

== Experiences and works ==
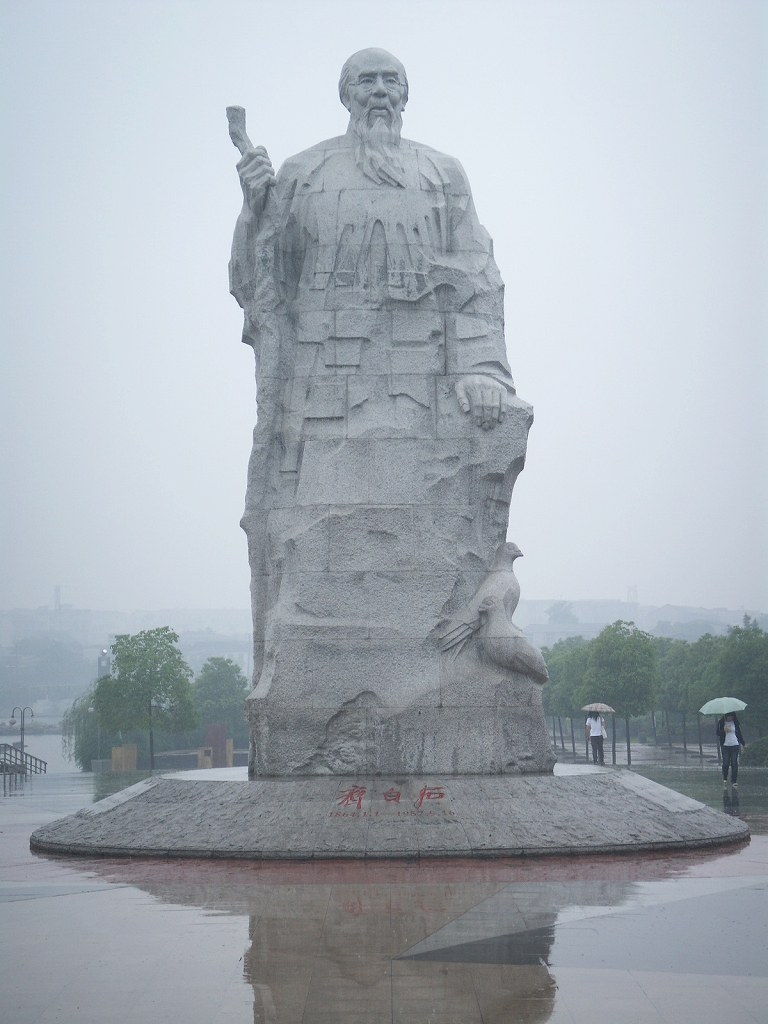
Monument in Qi Baishi Park, Xiangtan

Wang Chao-Wen said that while Qi was talking to a student in Beijing, he saw an outline of a bird on a brick floor in muddy water. He goes on to say that not everyone would have seen the bird, but because Qi was always concerned with finding new images to paint, he had a "special sensitivity". It was said that Qi had something special about him because he was constantly thinking about painting and had such a strong drive and motivation to be a great artist.

Excerpts from Qi Baishi's journal demonstrate the strong passion and conviction he had for his work. From the article "An Appreciation of Chi Pai-Shi's Paintings", his journal entry reads as follows:

"When I cut seals I do not abide by the old rules, and so I am accused of unorthodoxy. But I pity this generation's stupidity, for they do not seem to realize that the Chin and Han artists were human and so are we, and we may have our unique qualities too… Such classical artists as Ching-teng, Hsueh-ko and Ta-ti-tzu dared to make bold strokes in their paintings, for which I admire them tremendously. My one regret is that I was not born three hundred years ago, for then I could have asked to grind ink or hold the paper for those gentleman, and if they would not have me I should have starved outside their doors rather than move away. How wonderful that would have been! I suppose future generations will admire our present artists just as much as we admire these men of old. What a pity that I will not be there to see it!"

What is unique about Qi is that his works show no western influences, unlike most other artists at this time. Other artists praised Qi for the "freshness and spontaneity that he brought to the familiar genres of birds and flowers, insects and grasses, hermit-scholars and landscapes". Although Qi was not the first artist to focus on small things in nature, he was highly recognized for his thoughtful and lyrical approach in depicting these subjects.

Forgery and misattribution of Qi's work has become common in the contemporary art market. He is estimated to have produced between 8,000 and 15,000 distinct works throughout his life, of which 3,000 are in museums. However, since 1993, auction houses have attempted to sell over 18,000 distinct works attributed to him. A painting attributed to him, Eagle Standing on Pine Tree (老鷹圖), was sold for 425.5 million yuan ($65.5 million) in 2011, becoming one of the most expensive paintings ever sold at auction. However, doubts over the painting's authenticity were later raised by the bidder.

The market for Qi's paintings has made headlines in the art market, both for China and the world. In 2016, his works held the second position by value (third by number of lots to sale) by auction. At the end of 2017, the art world was rocked by the news that his Twelve Landscape Screens (山水十二條屏; 1925) catapulted him into the "$100 Million Club" by selling for $140.8 million (931.5 million yuan) at Poly Auction in Beijing.

== Family ==
Qi's first wife was Chen Chunjun. They got married when Qi was twelve years old in his Hunan hometown. The couple later had five children, three sons: Qi Liangyuan (born 1889), Qi Liangfu (1894–1913) and Qi Liangkun (born 1902) and two daughters (unknown names).

In 1919, Chen Chunjun came to Beijing and obtained Hu Baozhu (1902–1944) as Qi's concubine. From then, Qi and Hu lived together in Beijing. The couple had 7 children together: four sons—Qi Liangchi (born 1921), Qi Liangyi (born 1923), Qi Liangnian (1934–1938) and Qi Liangmo (born 1938)—and 3 daughters—Qi Lianglian (born 1927), Qi Lianghuan (born 1928) and Qi Liangzhi (1931–2010).

== Heritage ==
There were/are many painters of Qi's young generation:

Qi and Chen's children:

- Qi Liangkun (also known Qi Ziru) and his son Qi Kelai.

Qi and Hu's children:

- Qi Liangchi, also his son Qi Zhanyi
- Qi Liangyi also his son Qi Bingyi
- Qi Liangmo, also his son Qi Jianxiong and his daughter Qi Huijuan
- Qi Liangzhi, also her son Xiong Zhichun and daughters Xiong Youyou and Qi Yuanyuan

Qi Liangkun, Qi Liangyi, Qi Liangchi, Qi Liangmo and Qi Liangzhi have kept the family tradition ongoing and are actively painting the style learned from Qi Baishi. Xiong Zhichun was taught by Liangmo and Liangzhi, later studied in art academy abroad to form his personal art style.

== See also ==
- Chinese painting
- Qi Baishi (crater)
