= Lê Văn Đệ =

South Vietnamese painter

Celso-Léon Lê Văn Đệ (24 August 1906 – 16 March 1966) was a South Vietnamese painter who designed the South Vietnamese flag.

== Biography ==
A Roman Catholic, he was born in Mỏ Cày, Bến Tre, and was in charge of Asian Arts at the International Exhibition of Catholic Press at Vatican in 1936. He established the École supérieure nationale des Beaux Arts in Saigon.

Some of his works have been shown at the Vietnam National Museum of Fine Arts, Hanoi. Others are exhibited in Europe. A wall panel, Mater Amabilis and Saint Magdalene at the food of the cross was on show at the Missionaria Arte museum at the Vatican.

In 1930, he received a scholarship from the “Society for the Intellectual and Physical Improvement of the Indigenous People of Cochinchina” to study at the Beaux-Arts in Paris as a student of Jean-Pierre Laurens (1875-1932). The latter had welcomed two years earlier Fang Ganmin (1906-1984) who returned to China to become an influential teacher (notably of Zao Wou-Ki, Chu Teh Chun and Wu Guanzhong). He was in Paris when Fang fell in love with Sue Ailan (1905-1985) whom he met at the Beaux-Arts in the Humbert studio (the only one authorized to receive female students) and whom he would marry on his return to China. Lé Van Dé was noticed in 1932 and 1933 during the Salon Officiel des Artistes Français (Paris) and obtained an “honorable mention”. In 1934, the French government bought from him a large canvas (179 × 225 cm) “The family interior in Tonkin” which he exhibited at the International Exhibition of Colonial Art in Naples. He died in Saigon.
