= Chu Teh-Chun =

Chinese-French painter (1920–2014)

Chu Teh-Chun 朱德群
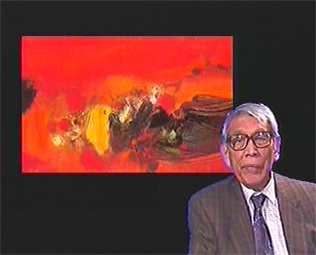
- Born: 24 October 1920; Xiao County, China
- Died: 26 March 2014 (aged 93); Paris, France
- Education: China Academy of Art
- Movement: Chinese Modernist
- Spouse: Tung Ching-Chao

Chu Teh-Chun
- Chinese: 朱德群
Transcriptions
Standard Mandarin
- Hanyu Pinyin: Zhū Déqún
- Wade–Giles: Chu Teh-ch'ün

Chu Teh-Chun or Zhu Dequn (24 October 1920 – 26 March 2014) was a Chinese-French abstract painter acclaimed for his pioneering style integrating traditional Chinese painting techniques with Western abstract art. Chu Teh-Chun enrolled in the National School of Fine Arts (now China Academy of Art), where he studied under French-trained Fang Ganmin and Wu Dayu. He was the first ethnic Chinese member of the Académie des Beaux-Arts of France, and together with Wu Guanzhong and Zao Wou-Ki were dubbed the "Three Musketeers" of modernist Chinese artists trained in China and France.

== Early life and education ==
Chu Teh-Chun was born in 1920 in the town of Baitu in Xiao County, which was then in Jiangsu province but now part of Anhui province. In 1935 he entered the National School of Fine Arts (now China Academy of Art) in Hangzhou, Zhejiang, graduating in 1941. At the school he studied Chinese painting under Pan Tianshou and Western art under Fang Ganmin and Wu Dayu, who were prominent Chinese artists trained in France. Among his schoolmates were Wu Guanzhong and Zao Wou-Ki. The three, dubbed the "Three Musketeers" of Chinese modernist art, were all elected as members of the Académie des Beaux-Arts. It was owing to Chu's influence that Wu Guanzhong decided to abandon engineering and become an artist.

Lin Fengmian, Wu Dayu and Fang Ganmin, and their students Chu Teh-Chun, Wu Guanzhong, and Zao Wou-Ki, have been collectively referred to the "West Lake" school of artists (西湖畫派).

== Career ==
In 1945 Chu became a faculty member of the architecture department of the National Central University in Nanjing, then China's capital. With the communist victory in mainland China, Chu moved to Taiwan in 1949, joining the National Taiwan Normal University where he taught Western-style painting. He moved to Paris in 1955, where he lived for the rest of his life. He became a French citizen in 1980, and a member of the Académie des Beaux-Arts in 1997.

In April 1956, Chu painted an oil on canvas portrait of his wife Tung Ching-Chao (董景昭), which won the silver medal at the Paris Salon. Chu called the painting his "lucky star", after which his career became increasingly successful. Wu Guanzhong praised the painting as the "Mona Lisa of the East".

Inspired by Nicolas de Staël's abstract landscape paintings, Chu abandoned figurative painting and adopted a unique style using bold strokes of colour which evoked Chinese calligraphy. His new style was immediately successful. In 1964, an exhibition of his works at the Carnegie Museum of Art in Pittsburgh brought him international fame. On 17 December 1997, Chu was elected a member of the Académie des Beaux-Arts of France, the first Frenchman of Chinese origin to be chosen. He was also made a Chevalier de l'Ordre des Palmes Académiques and Chevalier de la Légion d'Honneur in 2001. His paintings are now in the permanent collections of more than 50 museums all over the world. Major exhibitions of his work were held at the Shanghai Art Museum in 2005 and Beijing's National Art Museum of China in 2010.

In 2003, Chu donated an oil painting to the Shanghai Grand Theatre for its fifth anniversary. The painting now decorates the theatre's central lobby. At the unveiling ceremony, Chu called the painting his biggest and best work.

== Exhibitions ==
- 2012: Chu Teh-Chun: Nature in Abstraction, De Sarthe Gallery, Hong Kong
- 2020: Shifting Landscapes (with Andrew Luk), De Sarthe Gallery, Hong Kong

== Art market ==
In November 2013, an untitled oil on canvas diptych painted by Chu in 1963 was sold for HK$70.7 million (US$9.1 million) at an auction in Hong Kong, setting his personal record. His previous record was another diptych entitled "La Foret Blanche II", which was sold at auction in 2012 for HK$60 million, or $7.7 million USD The current auction record for the artist is HKD 229,568,000 ($ 29,544,254), achieved on April 21, 2021 at Sotheby's Hong Kong for a large triptych "Harmonie hivernale", from the artist's acclaimed snowscape series.

According to the Hurun Art List, the total value of Chu's artworks sold in 2013 at public auction was US$65 million, ranking third among all living Chinese artists, behind only Zeng Fanzhi and Fan Zeng.

== Death ==
On 26 March 2014, Chu Teh-Chun died in Paris at age 93, closely following the deaths of his friends and fellow modern artists Wu Guanzhong in 2010 and Zao Wou-Ki in 2013.
