= Yan Wenliang =

Chinese painter and educator (1893–1988)

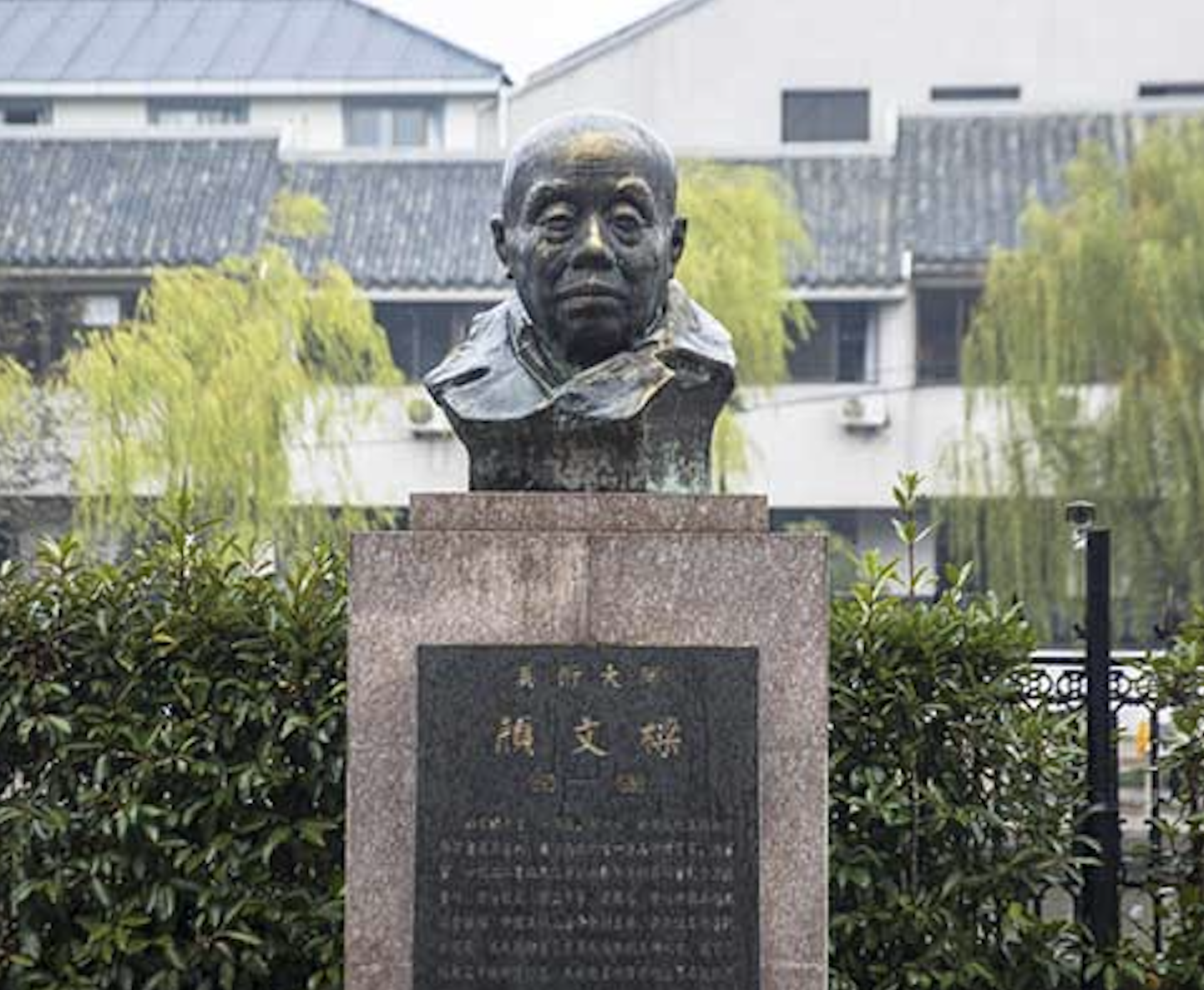
- Bronze Statue of Yan Wenliang
- Born: 20 July 1893; Shanghai, China
- Died: 1 May 1988 (aged 94); Shanghai
- Education: L'Ecole Superieure Nationale des Beaux Arts
- Known for: Oil painting
- Notable work: Kitchen, Southern Lake, The Countryside Late at Night
- Movement: Impressionism

Yan Wenliang
- Traditional Chinese: 顏文樑
- Simplified Chinese: 颜文樑
Transcriptions

Yan Wenliang (Chinese: 顏文樑; 20 July 1893 – 1 May 1988) was a Chinese painter and educator, who is regarded as one of the fathers of Chinese oil painting and an important art educator of his time. Born in Suzhou, Jiangsu province, Yan began studying painting in 1909, founded the Suzhou Art Academy along with Zhu Shijie in 1922 and went to Paris in 1929, enrolling in the L'Ecole Superieure Nationale des Beaux Arts, making him, along with Xu Beihong and Sanyu, one of the earliest Chinese artists to study abroad in France. He was one of the four pioneers of Chinese modern art who earned the title of "The Four Great Academy Presidents".

== Early life ==
Snow (1950) Yan Wenliang Oil on Canvas 89 x 122cm

Yan Wenliang founded the Suzhou Art Academy with his friend Zhu Shijie in 1922. Yan studied painting in Paris between 1929 and 1931, alongside other Chinese painters such as Fang Ganmin, his travels coinciding with those of Liu Haisu, and painted in the Impressionist style. While in Europe, Yan assembled a collection of plaster casts of famous European sculptures, which totalled as many as 500 pieces, which he shipped home to be used at the Academy.

== Post-1949 China ==
In 1952, as part of a national reorganization of art schools by the Chinese Communist Party, both Shanghai Art Academy and Suzhou Art Academy were moved out of Shanghai and formed the East China Arts Academy in Wuxi.

Yan Wenliang was transferred to the post of vice-director of the East China campus of CAFA, a job that Yan initially refused. Yan was ultimately persuaded by Boshan, a professor of the East China Cultural Department, appealing to Yan's ideals as an educator. Yan accepted the Hangzhou position to teach the ideologically unproblematic subjects of perspective and color theory. In 1957, Yan published a book on colour theory.

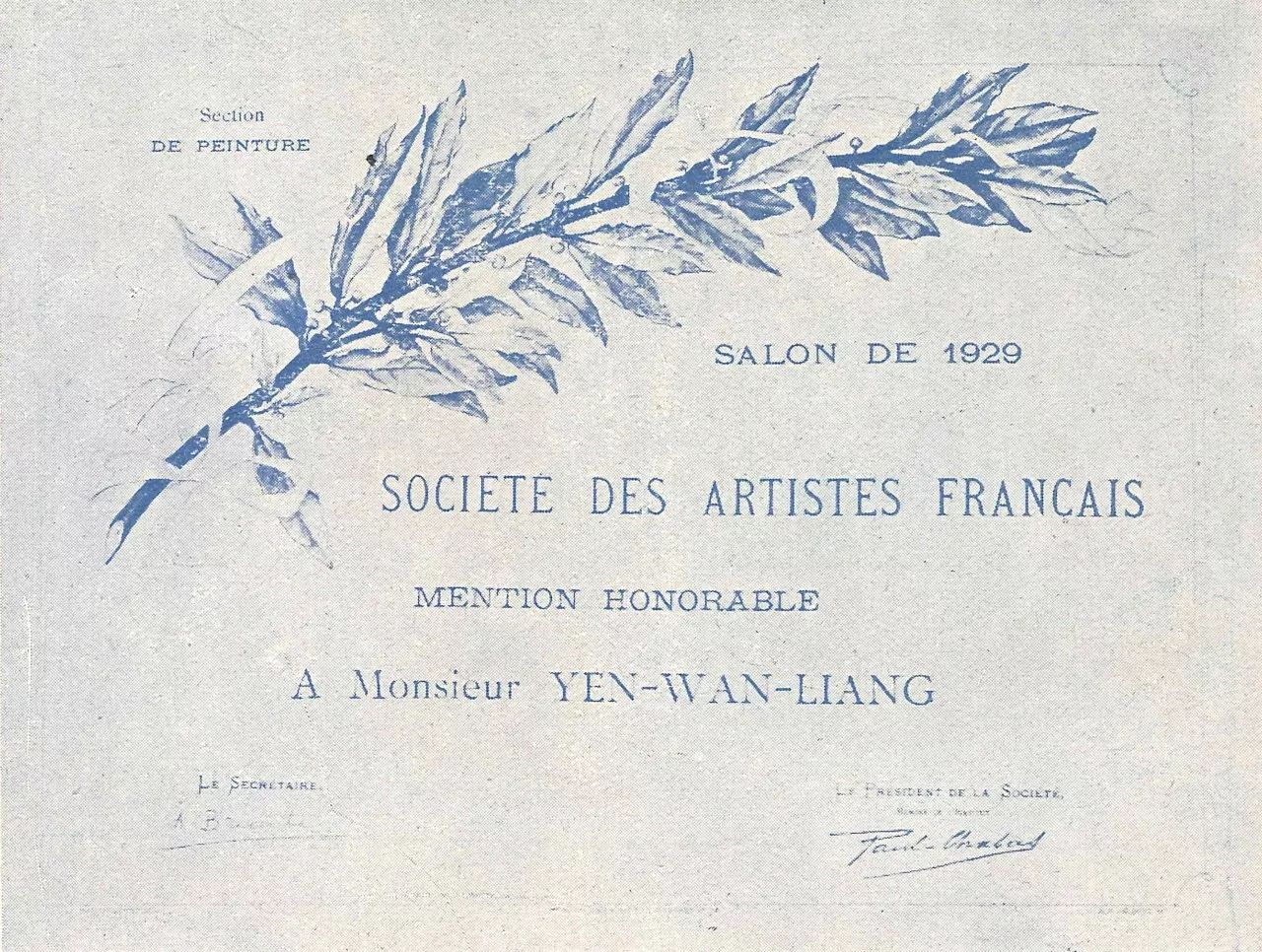
An Honourable Mention certificate Yan Wenliang received during his Paris years at the Salon de 1929

In the lively art scene of Shanghai, many painters worked in the Post-Impressionist and Fauvist styles taught before 1949 at the Suzhou Art Academy and the Shanghai Art Academy. The unofficial Shanghai art scene was dominated by the styles of Yan Wenliang and Liu Haisu, which trend persisted even during the later years of the Cultural Revolution.

== Cultural Revolution ==
One result of Yan's influence was the development of an underground landscape painting movement in Shanghai during the early 1970s, at the height of the Cultural Revolution's promotion of pro-government and Realist figure painting. After being tried by the Red Guards for some time, Yan Wenliang was liberated from the investigatory incarceration of the Cultural Revolution authorities in 1969 and spent time painting by himself for the rest of his years.

== Late life and legacy ==
Yan Wenliang attracted many young followers when it was discovered that he painted in the park and that he sometimes gave technical pointers to young artists who worked nearby. He welcomed the enthusiastic young artists to his apartment, where he showed them the paintings that he had painted in France and Italy 45 years before. The result of his kindness was that Romantic and Impressionist styles of early 20th century France became integrated into a new regional Shanghai style. It was also practiced and inherited by his students from the Suzhou Art Academy, and many self-taught artists of the 'lost generation', those born in the 1950s who had been denied formal schooling by the Cultural Revolution.

Yan Wenliang died in 1988 at the age of 94.

The Countryside Late at Night (1954) Yan Wenliang Oil on Board 36.5 x 62cm

== Works ==
The misty pagoda under the cold moon (1960) Yan Wenliang Oil on Canvas 47.5 x 29cm

Kitchen (厨房) (1920) is one of Yan's best-known works. A panoramic depiction of an old-fashioned Jiangnan kitchen scene, its lifelike imagery and balanced colors reflect the artist's grasp of perspective, light and shade.

The fifteen years between 1950 and 1965 were Yan Wenliang's most prolific period in terms of artwork and experimentation. A stable academic environment allowed him ample time to paint. It was during this period that Yan's style became fully honed. Important works of during period include Dawn of the Pujiang River (浦江夜航) (1953) and The Countryside Late at Night ((深夜之市郊) 1954). Dawn of the Pujiang River (浦江夜航) is in the collection of the Shanghai Museum in Shanghai.

Another notable work is Southern Lake (南湖) (1964), which depicts the "red boat on the Southern Lake", the allegorical birthplace of the Chinese Communist Party. It is in the collection of the National Art Museum of China in Beijing.

Yan's later period began with his return to Shanghai in 1969, when he produced works such as Ode of Our Country (1982).

Yan's oil painting "South Lake" (1964) was sold for RMB 28.7 million (~USD 4 million) at China Guardian Auctions in Beijing, China in 2020.

== Legacy ==
Serving as the first president of Suzhou Art School, Yan became on par in fame with Xu Beihong (president of Beijing's National Art School), Liu Haisu (president the Shanghai Academy of Fine Arts), and Ling Feng-mien (president of the National Hangzhou School of Arts). These artists had been labelled by painter Peng Xunqin as the Republic of China's four greatest in their position, and all four were spearheads of the national modern art movement of the time.

The other three masters became active in the areas of oil and Chinese ink painting. Yan Wenliang's whole career, in contrast, was spent on exploring the depths of oil painting, which led him to discovering a unique style and philosophy of painting on his own, and allowed him to combine in his creative processes the Western language of oil painting with Eastern values and aesthetics.

Art critic Shang Hui once said, 'Yan Wenliang was one of the very few Chinese artists to have a truly firm comprehension of impressionism while at the same time being a Courbet-influenced Europe-taught realist oil painter. In his artistic language, he was closer to Chinese aesthetics, but when compared with the other pioneers of modern Chinese art, Yan's style sported a great number of differences among many similarities.'

== See also ==
- Chinese painting
- Western painting
