= Sanyu (painter) =

French painter

- Born: 14 October 1901; China
- Died: 1966 (aged 64–65)
- Movement: School of Paris

Sanyu or Chang Yu (Chinese: 常玉; 14 October 1901 – August 1966) was a Chinese-French painter of the School of Paris.

== Biography ==
Chang Yu was born in Nanchong, Sichuan Province, on 14 October 1901. His family owned one of the largest silk-weaving mills in Sichuan, the Dehe Silk Factory, which was managed by Sanyu's eldest brother Chang Junmin. The business was so successful that Junmin earned the accolade Millionaire Chang of Nanchong and the annals of the city of Nanchong record and applaud his accomplishments. Thirty-seven years older than Sanyu, Junmin doted on his younger brother and, recognizing his interest and talent in art, spared little to support and encourage all his artistic endeavors. The family's wealth allowed Sanyu to be schooled at home, which included calligraphy lessons with the Sichuan calligrapher Zhao Xi (1877–1938) and painting lessons with his father, known in Nanchong for his skill in painting lions and horses.

Growing up in Nanchong, approximately 300 kilometres from Chengdu, Sanyu was most probably unaffected by the discontent that was brewing in the major cities of China at this time. After the overthrow of the Qing dynasty and the founding of the Republic in 1911, China was faced with growing autocracy from within and encroaching imperialism from without. Crippled by these dual tensions, compounded by the ineffectiveness of antiquated social and political systems, China was rendered impotent, forcing many to reassess the predicament of their torn nation. The unacceptable terms of the Treaty of Versailles forced a counter-movement that gained momentum through student organizations across the country, culminating in the historic May Fourth Incident. Academicians and students led the revolt against foreign infringement of China's territorial sovereignty and rights to self-rule. They recognized that to regain their country's integrity, China needed to strengthen itself through reform. A unified voice demanded the rejuvenation of the country through modernization, which, at that time, meant Westernization. Many resolved, therefore, to travel abroad to learn the ways of the West in order to benefit their troubled nation.

As a response to this call, students traveled to France under a government-sponsored work-study program. Although it is uncertain whether Sanyu participated in this program, his decision to make France his destination in 1921 was no doubt inspired by the migrating wave of art students, such as Xu Beihong and his partner Jiang Biwei with whom Sanyu became close friends. Xu and Jiang, who had arrived a year before Sanyu, were already finding life in the City of Light too costly for their meager income and decided to move to Berlin where living was cheaper. Sanyu, with no set agenda in Paris and unfettered by financial concerns, thanks to Junmin's generous support, decided to go along with them to Berlin. During this time, Sanyu formed friendships with other Chinese artists and writers, but instead of making art, they formed a culinary club, gathering daily to plan and prepare gastronomic specialties of their hometowns and having a good time. Only two works by Sanyu, Peonies and Landscape with Willow Trees, both painted in traditional brush and ink style, survive, further attesting to the lack of artistic activity during this period.

After two years in Berlin, Sanyu returned to Paris in 1923. While most of the Chinese art students aspired to enroll in the esteemed École nationale supérieure des Beaux-Arts, Sanyu preferred the less academic environment of the Académie de la Grande Chaumière. Here, Sanyu plunged into what to him was the exotic world of nude drawing. One can imagine the excitement the young Sanyu must have felt being in a studio where nude models, forbidden at home, posed at arm's reach. In this free and uninhibited environment, he could experiment with Western sketching techniques to explore and express the lines of the human form. Sanyu’s early works in Paris comprise exclusively ink and pencil drawings of nudes and figures, of which over 2000 examples survive today. He was considered a part of the School of Paris.

Trained in Chinese calligraphy during his youth, Sanyu produced many of his nude drawings in Chinese ink and brush. His calligraphic background shaped his treatment of the human body, with an emphasis on line and form rather than detailed anatomy. By using only a few strokes and the fluid qualities of brush and ink, he rendered his subjects in a highly economical manner.

Sanyu, along with Xu Beihong, Yan Wenliang, Lin Fengmian and Liu Haisu (collectively, the Four Great Academy Presidents) are widely known as the most prominent first-generation Chinese oil-painters who studied in France in the early 1900s.

== Marriage ==
Sanyu met his future wife at La Grande Chaumière. A young lady of twenty-one, Marcelle was impressed with Sanyu's talent and requested that he teach her. They became intimate and lived together for three years before getting married. Marcelle recalls that although they shared a lively time together, they never had enough money. Sanyu, however, seemed unconcerned, spending most of his time leisurely sitting in the cafés sketching for hours on the placemats and hanging out with friends. Accustomed to his brother's support, he was confident that money coming from home would continue, but the increasingly long intervals between allowances already anticipate the financial difficulties about to beset Sanyu.

== Dealership with Henri-Pierre Roché ==
In 1929, a year after his marriage, Sanyu met Henri-Pierre Roché, an astute and dynamic art collector and dealer better known as the author of Jules et Jim and Les deux anglaises et le continent. Sanyu was now facing financial difficulties as funds from Junmin became irregular due to the downturn in the silk business back home. Roché, who had a keen interest in discovering talent, with artists like Marie Laurencin, Georges Braque, Marcel Duchamp, and Constantin Brâncuși to his credit, saw promise in Sanyu and agreed to act as his dealer. According to Gertrude Stein, Roché "knew everybody ... and could introduce anybody to anybody." Indeed, Roché was the consummate dealer, promoting his artists to prominent collectors throughout Europe. Over the next two years Roché collected 111 paintings and 600 drawings by Sanyu. Nonetheless, Sanyu lamented, "As for my situation, it is very bad. My art dealer is paying me half the price and he buys very little from me. This is all due to the crisis. I can hardly go on living anymore. I don't know what I will do." Sanyu's constant complaining and demands for money turned him into more of a financial and emotional liability than an artistic asset and in 1932, Roché decided to drop the relationship.

== Techniques ==
Despite the sour note on which their relationship ended, Roché can actually be credited for the surge in Sanyu's creativity and development during this time. He had encouraged Sanyu to experiment with printmaking as a means of reaching a wider public at a lower cost. In prints Sanyu found another medium in which he could demonstrate the same sensitivity to economy of line as his drawings. Zinc plates for a series of prints commissioned by Roché show how the artist, using drypoint, an intaglio technique, incised thin and barely discernible lines directly onto the metal plate to create a delicate burr that produces the fine velvety effect of the finished image. Drypoint worked particularly well for Sanyu, the small size of the plates lent an intimacy with the viewer and the fine lines conveyed the essence of his simplicity and he applied it skillfully and effectively to his nudes. Even though Sanyu appeared to prefer drypoint, this method required the use of a press and the services of a professional printer, both costly. This was solved when he discovered linocut in 1932 at which time he started to make larger prints. Both Picasso and Matisse favored etching and drypoint during this period and Sanyu was undoubtedly influenced by these masters' prolific printmaking activities. However, Matisse did not start using linocut until 1938 and Picasso 1959, both years after Sanyu's initial exploration of the technique.

Matisse once noted that an artist "must draw first to cultivate the spirit and that it is only after years of preparation that the young artist should touch color..." Whether or not Sanyu was aware of Matisse's views, this was precisely the path he followed. All the sketching and drawing during his first eight years in Paris served to prepare Sanyu for his eventual foray into oil painting. His earliest oil painting is dated 1929, the year he met Roché, who undoubtedly saw the future potential of the oil medium for Sanyu and encouraged him to explore it. Under Roché's tutelage, Sanyu gained entrance to the Salon des Tuileries in 1930 and for the first time exhibited an oil painting, instead of the nude and still life drawings selected for previous salon exhibitions. By the early 1930s Sanyu was fully committed to oil painting, never revisiting printmaking and returning to drawings only as study sketches for his works in oil.

By the late 1930s and early 1940s with the war ravaging Europe, Sanyu fell into even more dire straits. Interest in printmaking dwindled and with no financial support, he could not even buy art supplies. Entries for salon exhibitions during this time indicate that Sanyu showed only sculptures of animals and figures (S001 and S002). Without the means to buy proper material, these sculptures are made of plaster and decorated with paint.

== Friendship with Robert Frank ==
In 1948, Sanyu traveled to New York. Looking for a place to stay, he met the renowned Swiss-American photographer Robert Frank who was planning an extended trip to Paris. The two decided to exchange studios. A change of plans, however, kept Frank in New York and they became roommates. According to Frank, "Sanyu came to America to promote ping-tennis. That was his only reason for coming." As soon as Sanyu moved into Frank's studio, he asked that all of Frank's furniture be removed so that he could paint the floor with his ping-tennis court. "I'll never forget the way he painted it," Frank recalls, "It took days. He painted it with the utmost care. It was beautiful. I'm sorry that I didn't photograph it." Sanyu confided to Frank that he was finished with painting and that for him, ping-tennis was the only way to attain financial prosperity. Evidently, he went to New York to look up Gottfried von Cramm who had moved there from Germany after marrying the wealthy American heiress Barbara Hutton. Von Cramm, having personal difficulties himself, was in no position to help Sanyu and so Sanyu's aspirations for his sport were once again thwarted. Aware of his friend's disappointment, Frank organized an exhibition for Sanyu in New York, but none of the paintings sold. Disillusioned, Sanyu decided to return to Paris leaving all his paintings to Frank as a way of repaying him for supporting him during his two-year stay in New York. Over the next two decades, Sanyu and Frank developed a deep and abiding friendship. As Frank's career as a photographer took off, he never forgot his dear friend and kept his paintings with him wherever he moved over the next fifty years. In 1997, Frank sold these paintings and donated the proceeds to establish the Sanyu Scholarship Fund at Yale University to support Chinese students of art.

== Return to Paris ==
When Sanyu returned to Paris in 1950, even though the post-war art market was recovering, he still had only meager success selling his paintings. He managed to survive by painting furniture and doing some carpentry work for Chinese friends in the restaurant business. There were a few promising moments for ping-tennis such as when he sold a few sets of ping-tennis equipment to the French newspaper France Soir and when he was asked to give instructions at a sports club but they amounted to virtually nothing. When Robert Frank visited Sanyu during this period, he sensed that Sanyu was lonely and ever more withdrawn. He did not have many friends and, according to Frank, people found it difficult to make contact with him. Perhaps the repeated disappointments in his life, whether as an artist or as the inventor of ping-tennis, forced him to acknowledge that no matter how difficult, he was first and foremost an artist.

== The School of Paris ==
In the first half of the 20th century, Sanyu worked in Europe. His desperate search for a link between traditional and contemporary, Eastern and Western artistic traditions is reflected in his works. Sanyu was an active figure who was part of the School of Paris. Before we explore the connection between Sanyu and the School of Paris, we must understand what is meant by the School of Paris and the circumstances under which it came into being. In Europe, the painful memories of the First World War led to a widespread shift in philosophies and attitudes on existence: people were desperate to enjoy the pleasures of the present, without concern for the future. In Europe, the 1920s became known as the Roaring 20s (Les Années Folles). Casting off the constraints of societal codes, new and extravagant trends, lifestyles and fashions emerged; miniskirts became fashionable, the market for decorative arts thrived, interest in exotic oriental culture grew. In particular, a love for Eastern culture became visible in many aspects of Parisian life. Jewelry and watches were inlaid with jades and gemstones from the East. Parisians were drawn to Chinese porcelain and Ming furniture. All of this attests to the unprecedented frequency of the interchange between the East and West. Additionally, Paris flourished into an international art centre – artists of all nationalities gravitated towards Paris to immerse in the exhilarating freedom and openness of the environment. The nurturing environment of Paris helped artists discover an individualistic voice from their respective backgrounds. This group of international artists became loosely known as the "School of Paris". Thus, the School of Paris does not denote an artistic movement or institution. Instead, it describes the international imaginative cross-fertilization of a diversity of styles. The international activity described by the term "School of Paris" opened a new door for modern art.

In 1920, Sanyu travelled to France under a government-sponsored "work-study" program. Entranced by the charms of Paris, Sanyu spent more than four decades in the artistic neighbourhood of Montparnasse, Paris. In the late 1920s, French scholar and collector Henri-Pierre Roché began to take a strong interest in Sanyu's paintings, acquiring many of the artist's works for his personal collection. At the time, Roche was an influential figure in the burgeoning art scene in Paris. In 1906, Roche introduced the 25-year-old Picasso to the Jewish-American Stein Family, who was residing in Paris. The Stein family subsequently collected key works from the artist's Blue Period and Cubist period, becoming important patrons of Picasso during this vital period that led to his subsequent success. While Roche collected numerous works by major Fauvist and Cubist artists, he often spoke of his admiration for Sanyu's exceptional creative gift. At his home, Sanyu's paintings were hung side by side with works of Matisse.

== Proposed exhibition in Taiwan National Museum of History ==
In 1964, Sanyu shipped forty-two paintings to Taiwan for the proposed exhibition with the intention of making the trip there himself a few months later. For unknown reasons, his travel plans failed to materialize. He tried to get his paintings back, but to no avail. Shortly thereafter, Sanyu died and his paintings have remained in the safekeeping of the National Museum of History in Taiwan ever since.

== Death ==
On 12 August 1966, Hau Shing Kang, a Chinese friend who owned a restaurant in Paris, went to visit Sanyu at his studio at 28 rue de la Sablière. When his repeated knocks on the door went unanswered, he alerted the concierge. Upon forcing the door open, they smelled a strong gaseous odor and when they went up to Sanyu's loft bedroom, they found him dead, lying in his bed with a book propped against his chest. According to Mr. Hau, Sanyu had a few friends over for a late dinner the night before and probably did not turn off his stove properly. After his friends left, Sanyu went up to read and, unaware of the gas leak, died in his sleep.

== The modernity in Sanyu’s painting ==
As an outstanding Eastern artists, Sanyu’s works transcend cultural barriers and reflected the Western modernism. Sanyu integrated the concepts of traditional Chinese painting with the expression forms of Western painting. Viewers can find the poetic and artistic conception of China on his paintings, while also observing the pursuit of nature in the western ideology.

In the western oil painting system, artists usually use toes to express light and shade, while in the Chinese ink-wash painting system, artist refer to using only black and white to express the Taoist thoughts, this corresponds to the Chinese aesthetic principle of “the supreme way is simple”. In Sanyu’s artworks, these two techniques are integrated together, he used simple and elegant calligraphy lines in western oil painting create a distinct “Sanyu” style. The embodiment of modernity reflected in Sanyu’s techniques, comes from the cultural hybridity.

As an Eastern artist born in China, depicting nude models was considered pornographic rather than artistic. Yet, nudes frequently appeared in Sanyu’s works, which later became one of the symbols of modernity in his art.

Sanyu successfully bridged eastern spirit-emphasizing emotion, minimalism, and harmony with Western modernist, offering a diverse and unique examples for non-Western artists on how to integrated local culture in the modernist wave. His “Chineseness” does not showed in subject , but in line work and the way of viewing; his “Westernness” does not revealed in style labels, but in the use of painting media and color.

== Different periods of Sanyu’s career ==
Sanyu’s artistic career is often divided into two golden phases based on his works and color palette. The period from 1921 to 1941, known in the art world as the “Pink Period,” features soft pink tones and centers on themes such as figure sketches, drawings, watercolor portraits, and floral still lifes. The subsequent phase, from 1942 to 1966, referred to as the “Black Period,” was influenced by World War II and the decline of his family fortune. During this time, his colors became darker and more intense, with bold, sharp lines. Dominated by black, dark green, deep blue, and brownish yellow, large areas of deep hues contrasted sharply with white spaces. His subjects—nude women, animals, and flowers—shifted in mood from relaxed and romantic to somber and isolated.

== The thoughts in the painting ==
Sanyu’s frequently used negative space in his works. This “emptiness” does not refers to nothing, but rather a compositional element—large areas of white, black, red, yellow, and Prussian blue forming the background, this is a symbol of modernism.

Unlike Western linear perspective, he preferred traditional Chinese ink painting, for example, a high horizon line and separate viewpoints that place figures and animals walking in endless space. His late landscape paintings are typical examples—tiny depictions of elephants, horses, and people wandering alone across vast deserts or open plains.

In Sanyu’s works, various images revealed a sense of inner calm. This perspective reflected the Chinese philosophical concept of “harmony between heaven and humanity.” This technique had a clear philosophical foundation: harmony with nature, reflecting his attitude of pursuing nature, cherishing depth of inner spirit, and understanding of life and the natural world.

== Legacy ==
His work "Reclining Pink Nude with Raised Arms," was featured in an art exhibition in Paris in 2025 commemorating asian artists of the School of Paris.

== Art auction results ==
=== 2019 ===
- Sanyu's last nude painting Nu (1965) sold for a record-setting HK$198m (US$25.24m) at Sotheby's in Hong Kong.
- Five Nudes (1950-1959) sold for HK$303m (US$38.72m) at Christie's Contemporary Art Evening Sale in Hong Kong

=== 2020 ===
- Fleurs dans un pot bleu et blanc (1950) sold for USD 25.5 million at Sotheby's in Hong Kong

=== References ===
SANYU Catalogue Raisonne Oil Paintings

- Wong, Rita (2001). SANYU, Catalogue Raisonne Oil Paintings. U.S.A.: University of Washington Press. p. 384. ISBN 957-744-411-3.

== Publications ==
- Sanyu: Catalogue Raisonne Oil Paintings by Rita Wong, March, 2001
- Sanyu: L'ecriture du corps (Language of the Body) Alessandra Chioetto (Editor), 2005
