= Li Xiuqin =

Chinese contemporary sculptor (born 1953)

Li Xiuqin (Chinese: 李秀勤; pinyin: Lǐ Xiùqín; born November 23, 1953) is a Chinese contemporary sculptor, professor, and the co-director of the 4th Studio of Sculpture Department of China Academy of Art (CAA), Hangzhou. She lives and works in Hangzhou, China.

== Biography ==
Li Xiuqin was born in Qingdao, Shandong Province, China. In 1982, she received her bachelor's degree from the Sculpture Department, Zhejiang Academy of Fine Arts, Hangzhou (now the China Academy of Art, CAA). She began to work in CAA as a teacher in sculpting after graduation. From 1988 to 1991, she researched at Slade School of Fine Art, UK and studied for her master's degree in the Sculpture Department, Manchester Metropolitan University, UK on scholarship from UK Cultural Exchange Committee.

== Early life ==
In 1985, not satisfied with the way of clay modeling at CAA, Li went to a small metal factory in Hangzhou to find the material and welder to make several metal welding sculptures. With her sculptures, she participated in The First Teacher Exhibition in the Sculpture Department in CAA, which enlarged her vision for metal materials. Assisted by her husband Guo Lianxun, Li started to work in a bigger metal factory to produce more metal welding works. The work produced in this period brought her the chance to study in UK.

== Major works ==
=== Sense of Touch - Concave-convex series ===
Li's best-known works were shown in her first solo exhibition the Sense of Touch - Concave-convex in CAA Art Space, Hangzhou, China in 1993. The inspiration for the works in this exhibition is from when she got rheumatic fever a research team in the northeast part of China, which almost cost her eyesight. Li began to study braille at that time. Due to her experience, her artistic thinking began to focus on the blind people and the process and way of the perception of braille. Her artistic practice is from amplifying, deconstructing and remodeling the elements in the braille. 15 works with the common element of braille made of materials such as stone, iron, bronze, and plaster were included. Blind kids were invited to touch the works and experience this exhibition.

In 2013, she held another exhibition titled 20 years - Sense of Touch - Concave-convex at CAA Art Space, Hangzhou and invited the same group of blind kids after 20 years to feel the works.

=== "Open" series ===
"After the Sense of Touch - Concave-convex exhibition, I was using the 'open' perspective to observe things, thinking over the form and structure in my works, which comes from the concave and convex of the braille." — Li Xiuqin.

Since the later part of 1993, Li produced the works Open The Earth, Open The Memory and Open The Space.

In 1999, she was invited to make a piece of works in Washington State University, in the US, and she made Opening the Secret. It is a rock sculpture created from volcanic basalt native to the Pacific Northwest region. Large stones are arranged to resemble huge books and split open to reveal secret messages in American and Chinese braille portrayed through concave openings and bronze rods. The sculpture was formally dedicated on July 14, 1999, and is behind the campus library.

"The process of translating these touchable messages becomes a bridge uniting visual and sight-impaired people." — Li Xiuqin.

== Solo shows ==
- Sense of Touch - Concave-convex, CAA Art Space, Hangzhou, China, 1993
- Li Xiuqin Exhibition, CAA Art Space, Hangzhou, China, 1995
- Installation-Sculpture-Painting, The 2nd Gallery Washington State University, WSU, USA, 1999
- 20 years - Sense of Touch - Concave-convex, CAA Art Space, Hangzhou, China, 2013
