= The Four Great Academy Presidents =

The Four Great Academy Presidents (or The Four Great Art Academy Presidents) is the title earned by four pioneers of Chinese modern art: Yan Wenliang, Lin Fengmian, Xu Beihong and Liu Haisu. These artists were revered in the early Republican Era due to their effective stewardship of the Soochow College of Art, the Hangzhou National School of Fine Art, the Art Department of Central University and the Shanghai Academy of Arts respectively.

== Careers ==
The Countryside Late at Night（《深夜之市郊》）（1954）Yan Wenliang Oil on Canvas

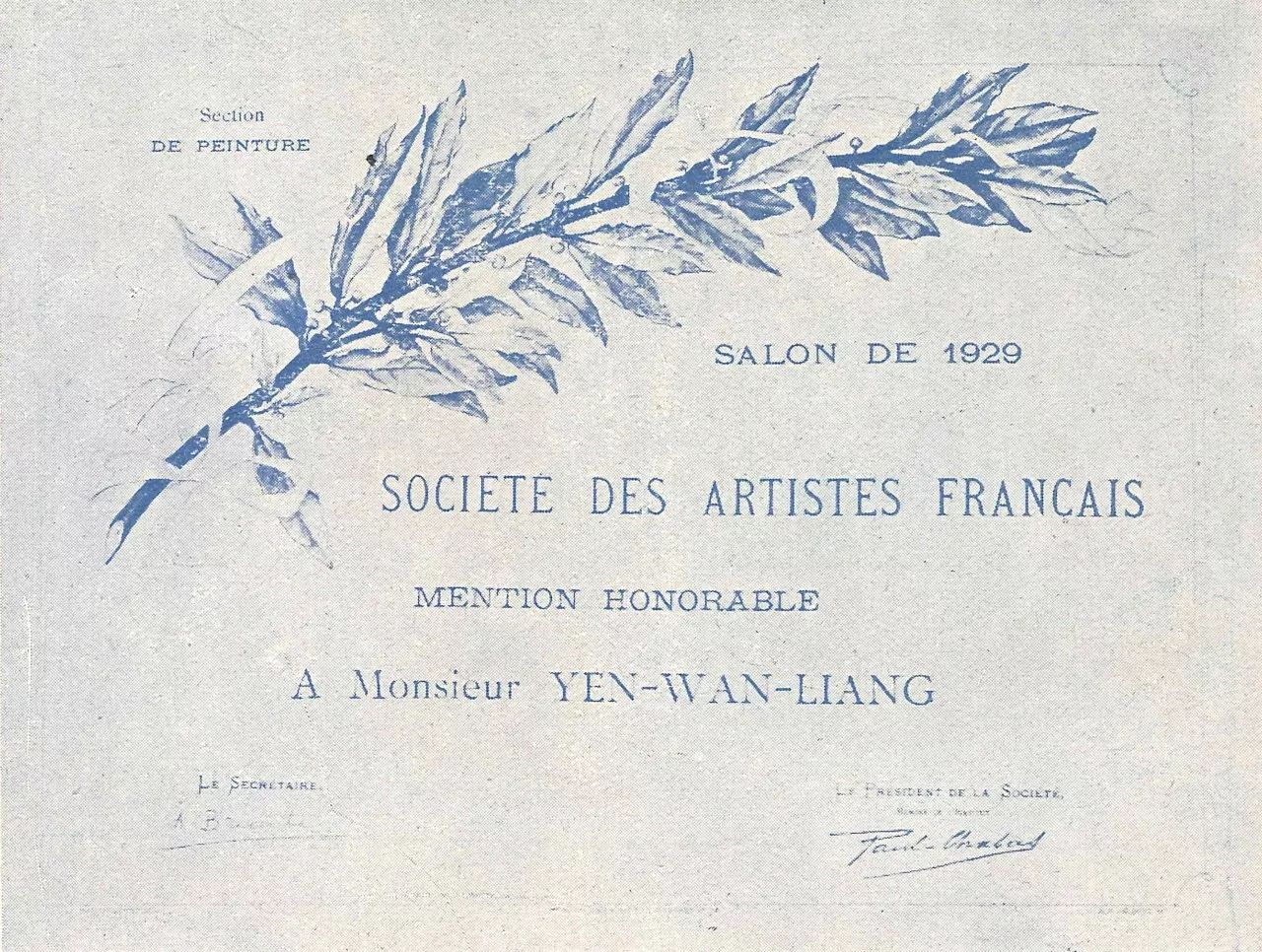
An Honourable Mention certificate Yan Wenliang received during his Paris years at the Salon de 1929

Yan Wenliang (20 July 1893 - 1 May 1988) was a Chinese painter and educator, who is regarded as one of the fathers of Chinese oil painting and an important art educator of his time. Born in Suzhou, Jiangsu province, Yan began studying painting in 1909, founded the Suzhou Art Academy in 1922 and went to Paris in 1929, enrolling in the L'Ecole Superieure Nationale des Beaux Arts, making him, along with Xu Beihong and Sanyu, one of the earliest Chinese artists to study abroad in France.

Lin Fengmian (November 22, 1900 – August 12, 1991), originally Lin Fengming (林鳳鳴), was a Chinese painter and is considered a pioneer of modern Chinese painting for blending Chinese and Western styles. He was also an important innovator in the area of Chinese art education.

Liu Haisu (16 March 1896 – 7 August 1994) was a prominent twentieth-century Chinese painter and a noted art educator. He excelled in Chinese painting and oil painting.

Xu Beihong (19 July 1895 – 26 September 1953) was a Chinese painter born in Yixing, Jiangsu province. He was primarily known for his Chinese ink paintings of horses and birds and was one of the first Chinese artists to articulate the need for artistic expressions that reflected a modern China at the beginning of the 20th century. He was also regarded as one of the first to create monumental oil paintings with epic Chinese themes – a show of his high proficiency in an essential Western art technique.
