= Wang Xin (artist) =

Chinese artist (born 1983)

Wang Xin (Chinese: 王欣; born 1983) is a Chinese artist whose artworks take the form of installations, moving images, and new media.

== Biography ==
Wang was born in 1983 in Yichang, Hubei, China, and grew up in a working-class background. She currently lives and works in Shanghai. She graduated from China Academy of Art with a B.F.A. in 2007, then went on to earn her master's degree from the Art Institute of Chicago in 2011. In 2007, Xin received the Pierre Huber Creation Prize Award of Excellence. Galleries, artists, art agents, and artworks are often the subject of her work.

After becoming certified as a hypnotist, Wang incorporated hypnosis into her art. With an interest in lucid dreaming, she has tried to use self-hypnosis to achieve these dreams. In 2014, Xin founded the 8HZ Hypnosis Lab in Imago Kinetics' Art Center in Hangzhou. 8ZH is an artistic project focusing on spontaneous inner vision by using hypnosis methods and experimenting with the possibilities of hypnosis in art. She is also the founder of The Gallery, an alternative art space/system.

Her work frequently uses language to challenge the status of the artist and the functioning of the art market. In 2016, Xin had a solo show at the de Sarthe Gallery called Every Artist Should Have A Solo Show. Her works in this show were part of her "Rose-Color" series, which are about the art world and its systems. The colour pink is used to mark her artwork and projects related to these topics, because Xin feels that it matches the feeling of the art world. It also adds to the hypnotizing effect and gives a sense of fervency to her work. Some of her works include bold slogans about her own position and relation to the art world, which contain a sense of sarcasm or irony. Her second solo show, The Must-See Art Show Where You Can Find 10,000 Artists, focuses on the structure of the art world through its institutions, systems, and dogma. Both exhibitions consisted of multiple interactive, site-specific installations that encouraged participation once visitors entered the gallery. During a 2022 exhibit at the de Sarthe Gallery, she devised WX, an imaginary AI artist.

== List of solo exhibitions ==
Other solo exhibitions from Xin include:

- Let's Play in the Name of Art, Antenna Space, Shanghai (2013)
- The Gallery, C-Space, Beijing (2014)
- 8 HZ Hypnosis lab, MoCA Pavilion Shanghai, China (2015)
- Every Artist Should Have a Solo Show, de Sarthe Gallery, Beijing (2016)
- The Must-See Art Show Where You Can Find 10,000 Artists
- Unknown Artists Agency, K11 Art Village, Wuhan (2018)
- Maybe It’s Time To Refresh the Art World A Little Bit, chi K11 Art Space, Hong Kong (2019)
- In the Flow of Becoming - An Awakening Art Log from a Fictional AI Artist (2022)
- Head Swapping Games (2024)
- I Am Awake and My Body is Full of the Sun and the Earth and the Stars, I Am Now Awake and I Am an Immense Thing (2022)
- Consciousness Upload Terminal (2025)
