= Changzhou needlework embroidery =

Changzhou Needlework Embroidery (Chinese: 常州乱针绣), or Free Stitch Embroidery, was founded in 1920 by lady Yang Shouyu (杨守玉, 1896–1981, Changzhou, Jiangsu), the younger cousin of Liu Haisu (刘海粟). She was a contemporary artist of embroidery and the master of Changzhou needlework embroidery. Changzhou needlework embroidery is the combination of the traditional Chinese embroidery and the Western oil painting.

== Manufacturing processes ==
Doing Changzhou needlework embroidery requires some oil painting skills because the first step is to draw a draft. And then the embroidery can be done. The production of Changzhou needlework embroidery requires piercing three layers of cloth. The first layer, according to the painted draft and the color lumps, is to make the background colored, cursorily. The thread should be thicker and longer. The second layer needs careful dealing and should pay attention to the production orders. The larger and back area needs to be done first and the following is the smaller and front part. In addition, the most important part has to do some further dealing. The third layer is to process meticulously and pay more attention to the changes of lines, lights and colors.

== Characteristics ==
One characteristic of the Changzhou needlework embroidery is ‘disorder’. However, the "disorder" doesn't mean "being unsystematic". It has its own rules. Another is paying more attention to the color effects. Changzhou needlework embroidery has more layers than other embroidery so as to have different color effects. When a work is done, it seems just like an oil painting.
