= Lalan (artist) =

Chinese-French artist

Lalan, born Xie Jing-lan (Chinese: 謝景蘭; 1921–1995), was a Chinese-French multidisciplinary artist. Lalan was among the early practitioners of integrated arts, incorporating painting, music, dance, and poetry into her performances.

Lalan was born in Guizhou, China. She received professional vocal training at the Shanghai Music Academy, and then studied composition and modern dance after relocating to Paris in 1948 with her then husband, painter Zao Wou-ki.

Lalan did not start painting until the age of 37. She began her independent artistic career in painting, composing electronic music and choreography in modern dance. In 1975, she received the Chevalier medal for the Ordre des Arts et des Lettres (Order of Arts and Letters) by the French Ministry of Culture. Lalan spent majority of her time in France with her husband French artist Marcel Van Thienen. She died in a car accident in 1995.

== Biography ==
Xie Jinglan, nickname Lan-lan, who later changed her name to Lalan, was born on September 14, 1921, in Guiyang, Guizhou Provence, China. Grew up in a scholarly family under the influence of the New Culture Movement, Lalan received Western education in Hongdao Girls' Middle School, an American missionary school in Hang Zhou. At a young age, Lalan had a gift for music and dance and was able to cultivate her talent thanks to her father Xie Meigen, who was a great flute musician and a scholar. In 1935, Lalan was introduced to Zao Wou-Ki, who was studied at the Hangzhou School of Art. In 1941, they got married in Hong Kong. The following year their son Zhao Jialing was born.

At the time, the headmaster of Hangzhou School of art was artist Lin Fengmian, who studied in France before coming back to China to teach. Lalan and Zao Wou-ki were motivated by their teachers. In 1948, after 36 days of travelling, Lalan and Zao arrived in France and settled down on Rue du Moulin-Vert District 14 Paris, and became neighbours of the sculptor Alberto Giacometti. Lalan later entered the Conservatoire de Paris and studied composition under Darius Mihaud. Inspired by a documentary about American Modern dancer Martha Graham, she received the Graham Technique training from Karin Waehner at Le Centre American. A dear friend of the couple Henri Michaux introduced Zao and Lalan to the "Father of Electronic Music" French composer Edgard Varèse who introduced Electronic Music to Lalan. To commemorate her mentor, Lalan painted A Edgard Varese in 1985. Through Michaux, Lalan met the violinist Marcel Van Thienen in 1952, who later became her second husband in 1957.

In 1956, Lalan and Zao Wou-ki decided to divorce after being together for over twenty years. Without the title of "the artist's wife", Lalan started her independent art career and ventured into the realms of painting, composing and choreography. In her practices, she incorporate the Chinese traditional Taoism philosophy, and the Lyrical Abstraction at the time, finding her unique voice in the Integrated art that she created since the 1970s.

== Artistic Development ==
=== Calligraphic abstraction (1957–1969) ===
Lalan was introduced to the Art Informel movement after moving to France. As a self-taught painter, she learnt about the language of modern painting through Lyrical Abstraction, started by artists like Georges Mathieu, Pierre Soulages, joined by Zao Wou-ki. The artists shared artistic characteristics such as explosive gestural lines, calligraphic signs and the improvisational way of creating.

The training in music and dance enabled Lalan's brushstrokes to express a dancer-like quality and musical rhythms. The canvases are larger than life, providing a dance stage for her paintbrush. From 1957 to 1959 she created a series of abstract paintings that were dark and meditative. She had her first solo exhibition in 1960 at the Creuze Gallery in Paris.

=== The tranquil landscapes (1970–1983) ===
Facing a plateau in the mid-1965s, Lalan looked back to her root culture to look for inspiration. She carefully studied the paintings by Song masters such as Ma Yuan and Xia Gui, as well as Taoist philosophy. Different from the early works, the paintings from this period appeared much in tranquil: the color palette became lighter and softer while the rhythmic lines became more refined, depicting natural elements such as mountains, rocks and the moon. The compositions are referencing the Song landscape paintings where the subjects are placed in a corner, leaving the blank space for imagination and harmony.

=== Integrated Art (L'art Synthèse) ===
In the 1960s and 1970s, Lalan focused on composing music and choreography. The Graham technique of "expressing inner feelings through bodily movement" was inspirational to Lalan. With her paintings as the backdrop, Lalan performed her own choreographed modern dance accompanied by her original electronic music at the Galerie Jacques Desbrières, and the Galerie Iris Clert. She incorporated painting, music and dance into her Integrated Art, "Spectacle". In 1973, Lalan received an award from the Culture Ministry of France for her parallel research of painting, music and dance. One of her three paneled painting, Sudden Blue (Soudain Bleu) staged for her choreography show "Le Cycle", was in the permanent collection of the Culture Ministry of France.

=== Return to abstraction (1984–1995) ===
In the 1980s, Lalan focused on painting. Her artistic style replaced the images of landscapes with abstraction. Lalan was experimenting with new techniques such as painting ultra-fine intuitive lines and dripping to create harmonious yet explosive works. In the late 1980s, Lalan and her husband moved to Bormes-les-Mimosas, southern France, where the beauty of nature became inspirational to the artists. Early in 1995, Lalan produced a film of solo dance titled "Dance of Qigong" (Danse du Qigong), introducing the traditional Chinese culture into modern dance, uniting intuitive dance movements with meditation and breathing exercises. This innovative and introspective dance was the last dance of Lalan. She died in a car accident a week after.

== Museum collections ==
- Culture Ministry of France
- Paris Modern Art Museum (Musée d'Art Moderne de la Ville de Paris)
- Frac Île-de-France, Paris, France
- Centre Pompidou - Musée National d'art Moderne, Paris, France
- Centre National des Arts Plastiques, Paris, France
- Macao Museum of Art, Macau, China
- Shanghai Art Museum, Shanghai, China
- Zhejiang Art Museum, Hangzhou, China

== Solo exhibitions ==
- 2021, Asia Society Hong Kong Centre, Extended Figure: The Art and Inspiration of Lalan
- 2020, Kwai Fung Hin Art Gallery, Hong Kong, Between Dream and Drama - Works of Lalan
- 2019, Sotheby’s S|2 Gallery, Hong Kong, Lalan: Endless Dance
- 2018, MAIIAM Contemporary Art Museum, Chiang Mai, Thailand, Lalan: The Cosmic Dance of the Paintbrush
- 2016, Kwai Fung Hin Art Gallery, Hong Kong, Singing in Colors and Dancing in Ink – Retrospective Exhibition of Lalan (Works of 1958-1994)
- 2011, University Museum and Art Gallery, The University of Hong Kong, Dance Melodies in Colours: Paintings by Lalan
- 2010, National Museum of History, Taipei, Fragrance of the Mind: A Retrospective of Lalan’s Work
- 2010, Macao Museum of Art, Macau, Fragrance of the Mind: A Retrospective of Lalan’s Work
- 2009, Zhejiang Art Museum, Hangzhou, Echoes of Paradise: Retrospective Lalan’s Art
- 2009, Shanghai Art Museum, My Vision of Paradise—Retrospective of Lalan's Art
- 2005, Espace Culturel du Lavandou, Le Lavandou, France, Lalan, Le Vent du Dernier Hiver
- 1990, Espace Pierre Cardin, Paris, France, Peintures de Lalan
- 1983, Maison pour tous, Saint-Quentin-en-Yvelines, France, LALAN (Exhibition and Art Synthèse)
- 1982, Galerie Bellint, Paris, France, LALAN
- 1976, Maison Heinrich Heine, Paris, France, Réve non réve (Art synthèse, music, painting and scenography by Lalan)
- 1975, Galerie du Centre Culturel Pablo Neruda; Maison des jeunes et de la culture Fernand Léger, Corbeil-Essonnes, France,LALAN
- 1973, Petit Palais, Paris, France, Trivalence (Art synthèse; Organized by Galerie Iris Clert, performance in the "5000 ans d’art chinois" exhibition, painting, music and choreography by Lalan)
- 1972, Maison des arts et loisirs de laon, Laon, France, Intérieur Externe (Exhibition and art synthèse, painting and music by Lalan)
- 1971, Galerie Moderne, Silkeborg, Denmark, LALAN
- 1966, Galerie 7, Paris, LALAN
- 1963, Galerie Mouffe, Paris, Paperback Gallery, Edinburgh, LALAN
- 1960, Galerie R. Creuze, Paris, LALAN

== Selected group exhibitions ==
- 2021, Kwai Fung Hin Art Gallery, Hong Kong, The Cornerstone
- 2020, Kwai Fung Hin Art Gallery, Hong Kong, Signifiants de l’informel 2020—Serge Poliakoff, Nicolas de Staël, Pierre Soulages, Georges Mathieu, Karel Appel, Zao Wou-Ki, and Lalan
- 2019, Musée Soulages, Rodez, France, Femmes années 50. Au fil de l’abstraction, peinture et sculpture
- 2018, Kwai Fung Hin Art Gallery, Hong Kong, Rue du Moulin Vert – Zao Wou-Ki, Lalan, Pierre Soulages, Nicolas de Staël, Sam Francis and Georges Mathieu
- 2014, Eslite Gallery, Taipei, Breeze From Paris—Lalan, T'ang Haywen, Hsiung Ping-Ming, Pan Yu-Lin and Sanyu
- 2010, Espace Culturel du Lavandou, Le Lavandou, France, Lalan-Van Thienen Collection of Lavandou
- 1994, Musée de l’Hotel de Ville, Le Lavandou, France, 3 Femmes, 3 Recherches – Lalan, Roberta González, Yann Piat
- 1992, Musée National des Arts Asiatiques - Guimet, Paris, France, Journées Pour la Poésie (Days of Poetry)
- 1991, Musée des Hôpitaux de Paris, Paris, France, Le Sang (The Blood)
- 1988, Grand Palais, Paris, France, Hommage à Iris Clert
- 1983, Mairie du 6e arrondissement, Paris, France, Artistes Chinois de Paris (Chinese Artists in Paris)
- 1981, Espace Pierre Cardin, Paris, France, 37e Salon de Mai
- 1981, Organized by the Centre culturel de I’Yonne, Abbaye Saint-Germain, Auxerre, France, Lalan Paintings – Van Thienen Kinetic Sculptures
- 1974, Galerie Iris Clert, Paris, France, Grandes femmes, petits formats (Great Females, Small Formats)
- 1971, Fundação Calouste Gulbenkian, Lisbon, Portugal, Arte francesa depois de 1950 (French Art after 1950)
- 1970, Palais des Beaux-Arts, Brussels, Belgium, Trois tendances de l’art contemporain en France (Three Trends in Contemporary French Art)
- 1968, Musée d’Art Modern, Rijeka, Yugoslavia, Exposition internationale de dessins originaux (International Exhibition of Original Drawings)
- 1966, Musée d’Art Moderne de Paris, Paris, France, 22e Salon de Mai

== Monograph ==
LALAN is a comprehensive monograph jointly published by Kwai Fung Art Publishing House and Rizzoli International Publications in 2022. It showcases 160 of Lalan's works, encapsulating three crucial phases of her career from the 1950s until her untimely passing in 1995. Compiled from meticulous two-year research in collaboration with the artist's estate, the monograph offers an in-depth exploration of Lalan's artistic journey.

The monograph features a scholarly essay on Lalan's multidisciplinary practices by Dr. Véronique Bergen, alongside contributions from notable individuals associated with Lalan, including her son Zhao Jia-Ling, Jean-Michel Beurdeley of the Lalan Estate, Catherine Kwai from the Lalan Archive, and Raphaël Dupouy from Réseau Lalan. It also presents excerpts of critiques by art historian Vadime Elisseeff and playwright Eugene Ionesco.
