= Ana Maria Micu =

Artist (b. 1979)

- Born: 1979 (age 46–47); Botoșani, Romania.
- Website: www.anamariamicu.com

Ana Maria Micu (born 1979) is a Romanian visual artist who works and lives in Botoșani, Romania. She graduated from the Art and Design University of Cluj-Napoca, receiving a B.A. in Fine Arts in 2002 and an MFA in 2004.

== Biography ==
Micu was born in 1979, in Botoșani, Romania. Her mother, a math teacher, encouraged her to pursue studies in mathematics. Instead, Micu elected to study fine arts in high-school, and later at the Art and Design University of Cluj-Napoca. She chose to study painting at a time when the trends in contemporary Romanian art favored photography, video, and conceptual art.

== Career ==
Early in her career, Micu became known as a figurative painter, exploring body language and movement through informal portraiture, and incorporating paintings within paintings in her work. Her more recent work has focused on self-portraiture and the depiction of interior, personal spaces, which attempt to demonstrate that a woman approaching her 40s can live alone in an apartment and produce significant artistic output.

Micu is a realist painter, working with photography, sketching, graphite drawings, and easel painting. She often takes snapshots of her apartment and studio, using the photographs as the basis of works that incorporate elements of still life, landscape, and self-portrait. Her artworks are celebrated for their attention to detail of every object in the painting, where "light is the star of the show".

Micu has had solo shows in Romania, China, and Taiwan, and in addition has participated in group exhibitions in the Netherlands, the UK, and the United States.

== Exhibitions ==
- Speaking About the Unknown (Mind Set Art Center, Taipei, 2019)
- A Picture on the Wall (Mind Set Art Center, Taipei, 2018)
- Self-portrait and Indoor Plant (Mind Set Art Center, Taipei, 2015)
- Tender heart, keep still! (C-Space, Beijing, 2012)
- Ideal Spleen (Anaid Art Gallery, Bucharest, 2007)
- Bloom (Anaid Art Gallery, Bucharest, 2006)
