= Zhu Shijie (painter) =

Chinese painter

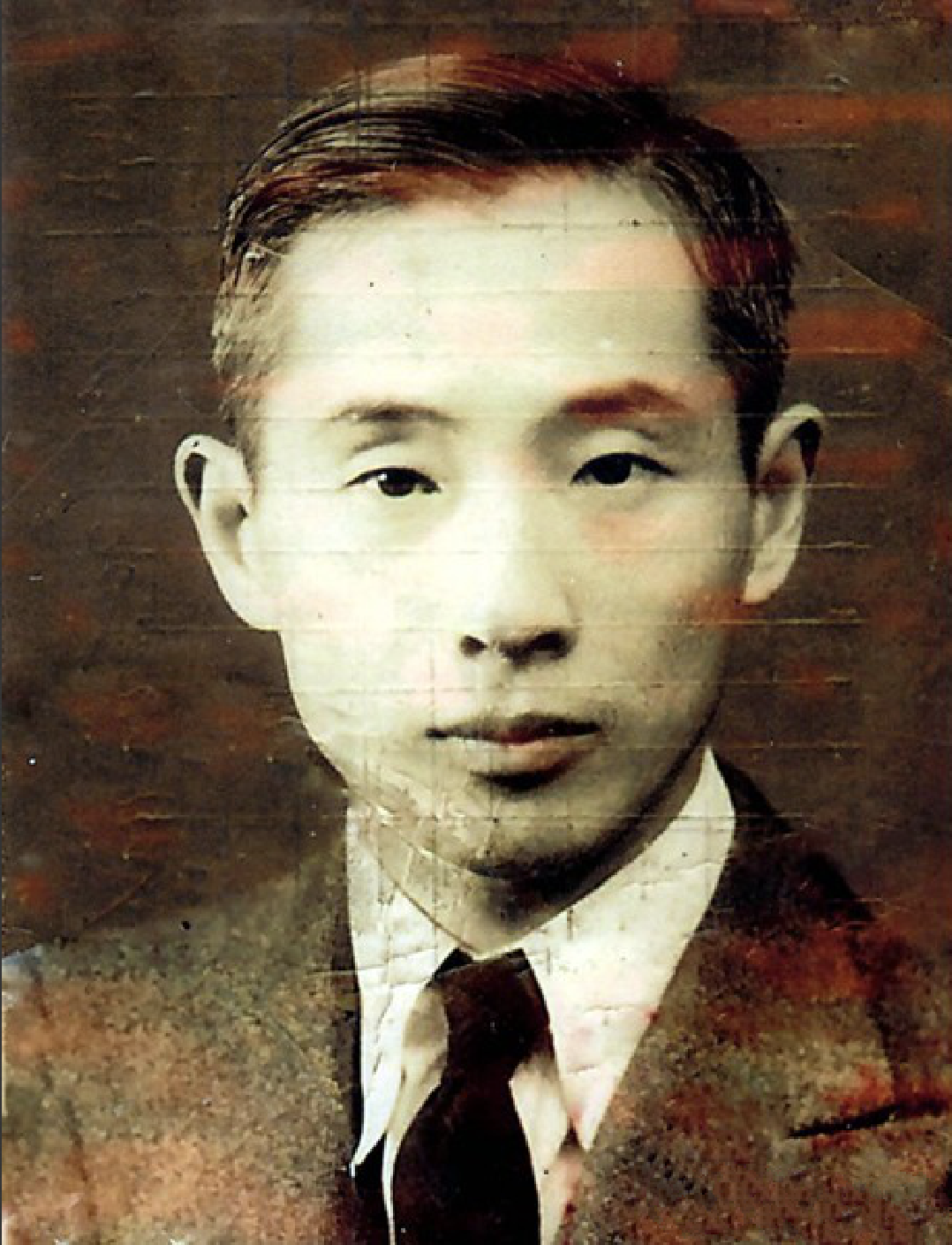
- Zhu Shijie (circa 1930)
- Born: 20 January 1900; Suzhou, China
- Died: 1 February 1990 (aged 90); Suzhou
- Known for: Oil painting
- Movement: Impressionism

Zhu Shijie
- Traditional Chinese: 朱士傑
- Simplified Chinese: 朱士杰
Transcriptions

Net Spreading（1987） Zhu Shijie Oil on Canvas

Zhu Shijie (Chinese: 朱士傑; 1900 - 1990) was a Chinese painter and educator, who is regarded as one of the fathers of Chinese oil painting and an important art educator of his time. Born in Suzhou, Jiangsu province, Zhu began studying painting in 1912 and founded the Suzhou Art Academy in 1922. In the 1920s, Zhu went to Japan and brought back to China the Bauhaus concepts and ideas of practical art. Zhu, along with Yan Wenliang and Hu Cuizhong comprise the “Three Masters of Suzhou”.

== Early life ==
Zhu Shijie studied traditional Chinese paintings, including flower, bird, and landscape, under Yan Chunsheng and Fan Shaoyun in 1912.

== Career ==
Timely Snow（1980） Zhu Shijie 65×40cm Oil on Canvas

In 1922, along with two other artists Yan Wenliang and Hu Cuizhong, He established the Suzhou Academy of Fine Arts. In a national reorganisation in 1952, the Suzhou Fine Arts Institute and the Shanghai Fine Arts Academy were incorporated into the Nanjing Academy of Fine Arts. Zhu, Yan and Hu were passionate about reforming traditional art education in China. They attempted to modernise Chinese art education by introducing western concepts and methods in their school.

The Academy fundraised and bought a large amount of torso and plaster from Paris in the late 1930s. While in Europe, Yan assembled a collection of plaster casts of famous European sculptures, which totaled as many as 500 pieces, which he shipped home to be used at the Academy. Zhu was then tasked to fix those sculptures that were damaged during transit.

Many well-known artists were nurtured such as Luo Erchun, Mo Pu and Fei Yifu.

For a large part of his life, Zhu taught in Eastern China College of Art, the former Nanjing Academy of Fine Arts.

== Work ==
9 works including "Jing Gangshan Mountain" and "Small Wharf at Dongting Lake" are part of the collection of the National Art Museum of China in Beijing.

His important works such as "Net Casting" and "View of the Bridge" are at Jiangsu Fine Arts Museum.

A sizable portion of Zhu's work is in private collections in Taiwan and Hong Kong.

== See also ==
- Staatliches Bauhaus
