= Wu Guanzhong =

Chinese painter (1919–2010)

- 吳冠中
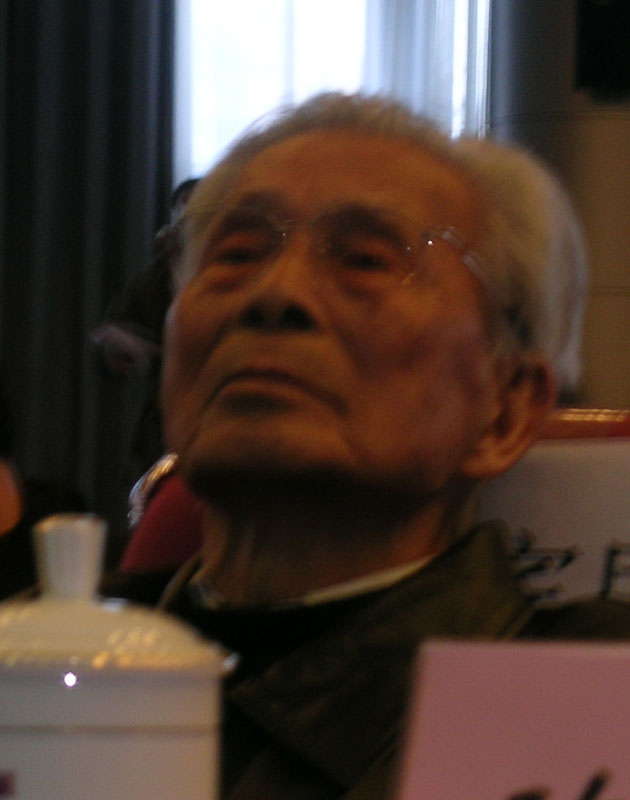
- Born: 29 August 1919; Yixing, Jiangsu, China
- Died: 25 June 2010 (aged 90); Beijing
- Education: China Academy of Art
- Known for: Ink wash painting, Oil painting

Wu Guanzhong (simplified Chinese: 吴冠中; traditional Chinese: 吳冠中; pinyin: Wú Guànzhōng; 29 August 1919 – 25 June 2010) was a contemporary Chinese painter widely recognized as a founder of modern Chinese painting. He is considered to be one of the greatest contemporary Chinese painters. Wu's artworks display both Western and Eastern influences, such as the Western style of Fauvism and the Eastern style of Chinese calligraphy. Wu painted various aspects of China, including its architecture, plants, animals, people, as well as many of its landscapes and waterscapes, in a style reminiscent of the impressionist painters of the early 1900s. He was also a writer on contemporary Chinese art.

== Life ==
Wu was born in a village in Yixing, Jiangsu province, in 1919. His family wanted him to become a teacher, as his father had been. In 1935, Wu passed the entrance exam and studied electrical engineering at Zhejiang Industrial School (浙江公立工业专门学校, a technical school of Zhejiang University) in Hangzhou. While in engineering school, Wu met an art student named Zhu Dequn who was studying at the National Hangzhou Academy of Art. During a trip to Zhu's school, Wu got his first look at art and fell "madly in love" with it. Against his father's wishes, in 1936 he transferred to the art academy, studying both Chinese and Western painting under Pan Tianshou (1897–1971), Fang Ganmin (1906–1984) and Li Chaoshi (1893–1971).

Wu went through many trials and challenges during his years in college before he could master his craft. In 1937 the Sino-Japanese War began and the campus had to pick up and relocate in order to get out of the way of the invading Japanese army. During the constant movement during the war, Wu was able to see many different locations. He considered the adventures as a necessary journey to becoming a man and building his character. Wu benefitted greatly from the many teachers who taught him to paint and the rough journey to becoming a man. In 1942 he graduated from Hangzhou National Academy of Art and tried to find a job. During the war jobs were hard to find and Wu took a part-time job as a substitute teacher. He later found a job as a watercolor and drawing teacher in the Architecture Department of Chongqing University.

After Wu graduated he continued to hone his craft and studied with some of his old colleagues from school, like Zhu Dequn, Li Lincan and Zheng Wei. Each of these friends continued their art careers and left their mark on the art scene. In 1946 Wu applied for one of the two art study abroad spots and was the best applicant who applied; this was in part to his French language studies. 1947 traveled to Paris to study at the Ecole Nationale Supérieure des Beaux Arts on the government scholarship. Even though France was still recovering from World War II, Wu was completely enthralled with the art he saw there. He visited all of the city's major museums within the first few days of his arrival. Wu was always a tremendous fan of French and European art. While in Europe, Wu realized that the many cultural and religious differences between Europe and China made it difficult for him to understand and appreciate some of the art. He took great interest in the modern art of France, especially Post-Impressionists such as van Gogh, Gauguin and Cézanne. Wu loved van Gogh the most because of van Gogh's passion for art and the internal torment he endured. He also identified with the hardships that Gauguin felt when he left Paris for a South Pacific island in order to find his own personal ideal. Wu's trip to France helped him grasp the idea of form and the basic meaning of art. The study abroad trip also led to formalism becoming the basic underlying element of his art and studying in France helped him better understand formalism.

Wu returned to China in the summer of 1950 to the excitement that was brought by the new People's Republic of China government. The government assigned jobs to all of the returning students who came back after the new government took control. Everyone felt anxious and excited to contribute to the building of a new nation. Wu introduced aspects of Western art to his students at the Central Academy of Fine Art in Beijing, where he taught from 1950 to 1953. He was excited to be the first Chinese artist to return from France with knowledge and theoretical framework for French modernism. While teaching, many peers criticized him because of jealousy over his job and because he was the only painter practicing formalism. The academy was known to have been dominated by social realism, and Wu was called "a fortress of bourgeois formalism". The issues became so bad he could no longer stay at the Central Academy and transferred. Between 1953 and 1964 he taught at Tsinghua University, and then Beijing Fine Arts Normal College. As a professor Wu was able to take many trips around the country and discover the expanse that was the new China. Wu was full of ambition and energy and travelled to many locations where his peers wouldn't go. He enjoyed the freedom of travel, which allowed him to paint or sketch wherever and whenever he wanted. This is when Wu made a transition to landscape since he travelled all over the country. He was later appointed a professor at the Central Institute of Arts and Crafts, Beijing in 1964.

In August 1966, at the outset of Mao Zedong's Cultural Revolution, Wu was prohibited from painting and writing about art, and many of his early works were destroyed. In 1970, at the age of 51, he and his wife were separated and assigned to almost 3 years of hard labor in the countryside as part of the Communist Party's vast re-education program. Wu stated, "Life was only planting rice, carrying coal, criticizing one another, and fighting one another…The only thing that no one was allowed to do was paint." Following that period, he was only allowed to paint on Sundays (his day off from the fields) or on holidays. He heard of artists being persecuted and even killed, so he burned his nude paintings since they would be severely criticized and frowned upon. Wu did not suffer too much physical harm, because he had destroyed many of his own paintings, but this caused him much emotional harm. Finally in 1972, he was allowed to return to Beijing to paint hotel murals and decorations.

During the 1970s, Wu changed his style based on what others were doing at the time. He started painting with oil and watercolor in a Western style until he returned to Beijing and saw other artists using watercolor in the traditional Chinese style. In 1975 a Chinese art association in Japan wanted some traditional Chinese ink paintings to exhibit. Once again Wu changed his style to match the specifications, and his work became a great hit. From here Wu moved on to another phase where he painted with oil and concentrated on the human body and the beauty of form. Wu also realized he could achieve the same beauty and form through landscape while using Chinese ink and color on paper.

It was not until after Mao's death in 1976 that Wu, like many of his peers, was able to return to his art-making. This opened up the door for artists to branch out international. Unfortunately for most of the artists, there was an immense gap in artistic ideas between China and the rest of the world. The only one who seemed able to bridge this artistic gap was Wu. With the newfound freedom, Wu was able to break away from the old constraints and get back to the formalism style he originally loved. Along with being able to paint again, he was able to be more of a public figure in the art scene without fear of retribution. He wrote an essay for a May 1979 issue of Meishu titled "The Beauty of Form in Painting". He discussed his theory of formalism in the article as "A vast number of workers in art now hope for the opening of European modern painting to them, to discuss the scientific nature of the beauty of form. It is the microscope and surgical knife of formal art as a means to enrich and develop heritage. Oil painting must be nationalized; Chinese painting must be modernized. It seems that only after we have seen the Japanese painter Higashiyama Kai's explorations have we come to have a clear understanding about the problems of uniting the East and West."

Wu has written many other articles based on his version of form and how it applies to modernism. He considered himself primarily a painter and not a theorist. He had the approach of going out and looking at nature to find something that piqued his interest. Then he would start with a preliminary sketch of what it was that he saw. Next he spent a great deal of time in the studio trying to figure out the best way to show the power of the form of the object. He would then paint quickly and impulsively with whatever European of Chinese brush felt right. Wu would go on painting for hours until he was too emotionally drained to continue. He had his first professional solo exhibition in 1979, and his career took off in the 1980s. He has been the solo exhibitionist in over ten and been part of a joint exhibition in over ten others.

In 1991 Wu was made an Officier de l'Ordre des Arts et des Lettres by the French Ministry of Culture.

Early in his career Guanzhong adopted the pen name Tu, which he used to sign his work.

Wu died at the age of 90, during the night of June 25, 2010, in Beijing Hospital.

== Paintings ==
=== Twin Swallows ===
Among many of Wu Guanzhong's paintings, Twin Swallows was the most outstanding and representative of his search for a synthesis of Western elements into traditional Chinese painting. It is a painting that captures both the static form of traditional Jiangnan architecture and the motion of two swallows as they fly toward a tree. Geometric shapes, especially rectangles, dominate half of the painting. For example, the front walls of the houses are horizontally placed white rectangles with simple black and gray lines to depict the edges and rooftop of each building. Doorways were painted in the same minimalistic manner, yet the contrast between the darkness inside the building with the lighter door frame is prominent enough to create a sense of depth. Wu's attention to perspective and depth in Twin Swallow is a factor that distinguishes himself from many other traditional guohua painters. Although the white walls in Twin Swallows may seem like the dominating elements in this painting, it is in fact the pair of swallows that reveals Wu's intention behind this painting. In the 1950s, Wu returned from France to his homeland. It was also a time when Chinese art entered the phase of socialist realism. This artistic movement had encouraged many artists to create artwork in order to contribute to the Chinese society. Similarly, Wu felt obligated to pass on the knowledge that he had gained in France to the younger generations in China in order to promote the idea of a synthesis among Western and traditional Chinese art.

=== Lion Grove Garden ===
Lion Grove Garden was painted in 1983. The subject of this painting, Lion Grove, is the largest rockery in Suzhou. Wu Guanzhong had successfully incorporated the use of lines, planes, and dots in this painting. The lines were used to express a sense of freedom, which was also what Chinese artists enjoyed after the Cultural Revolution. Unlike traditional guohua artists, Wu's ink outlines no longer suggest the physical form of the rocks, but instead seem to suggest how Wu perceive this landscape. The forms of the rocks are shaped in diverse ways, some being round, uneven, and hollow. He paid careful attention to the ups and downs, concave and convex, caverns and peaks, and sizes of the rocks. Although the structure of the rockery is hardly identifiable in this painting, this sense of ambiguity further encourages viewers to use their imagination and look beyond what is presented in front of their eyes. About two-thirds of the paintings consist of sinuous lines and splashes of ink and colored dots, of green, yellow, purple and red, that reinforces the spontaneity and fluidity of the painting as each dot sparkles across the painting. Artistic element of planes, such as the rooftop of Suzhou-style pavilion, the bridge, and the cloister add a hint of realistic element. The foreground of this painting is a lightly shaded pale grey water where the fish reside. Although the foreground isn't as eye-catching as the rockery, it grounds the complex elements in a stable dimension.

== Exhibitions ==
Most of Wu's early works were destroyed during the Cultural Revolution. It is difficult to track down works from his early days. Wu had an exhibit in 1942 when he was in school and it was hosted by the Sha Ping Youth Palace.

Wu Guanzhong has had solo exhibitions in major art galleries and museums around the world, including China, Hong Kong, Singapore, Tokyo, Taipei, Korea, France, England and the USA. His paintings were exhibited at the British Museum in 1992; Wu was the first living Chinese artist to have an exhibition there. One of his paintings, Seascape at Beidaihe (1977), was shown at the Metropolitan Museum of Art as part of an exhibition of paintings from the collection of art dealer Robert H. Ellsworth . His work may also be seen in the collection of the Hong Kong Museum of Art.

In 2008, Wu donated 113 works to the Singapore Art Museum (SAM). This donation is the largest Wu Guanzhong donation to a public museum. In 2010, Wu donated works to the Hong Kong Art Museum.

In 2024, the Hong Kong Museum of Art ran a special exhibition titled "Wu Guanzhong: Between Black and White".

== Quotes by Wu Guanzhong ==
"Through painting landscapes I have grown to love my motherland even more and wish to be forever intoxicated in her embrace."

"For people's hearts to communicate, there must be genuine emotion to strike a chord. Whether the feelings and perceptions of modern Chinese can find resonance in the West depends on the emotions, if they are true or false. Intelligent viewers can discern what is real and what is false."

"Abstract beauty is the heart of the beauty of figurative art. It is a natural thing to which we all respond. As a child loves to play with a kaleidoscope, so everyone likes pure form and color."

"So often there is conflict between them, and this is my greatest sorrow....Whatever I have written is to try to help our own people to understand and to get rid of their fear and suspicion of abstraction in Western art. So I can only start talking from a point of semi-abstract art, which is easier to understand. But even when I talked this away, recently there were lots of argument and objections."

"'Image' exists in the objective world. Not all images are beautiful. The discerning power of the artists eye lies in its ability to recognize the beauty in images, to grasp the elements that constitute this beauty, and to bring this beauty out in his expression, thus creating a sense of sympathy in the audience!"

"In searching for all the marvelous peaks to make sketches, for thirty years during winter, summer, spring, and autumn, I carried on my back the heavy painting equipment and set foot in the river towns, mountain villages, thick forests, and snowy peaks – from the farthest corner of the Eastern Sea to the border towns of Tibet, from the ruins of ancient Greek Gaochang (in Xinjiang) to the isles of seagulls, I stayed in truck stops, courtyards of fishermen's homes, factory buildings, and broken temples....In all of these I trained myself to develop endurance."
