= Fang Ganmin =

Chinese painter, sculptor and educator

- 方幹民
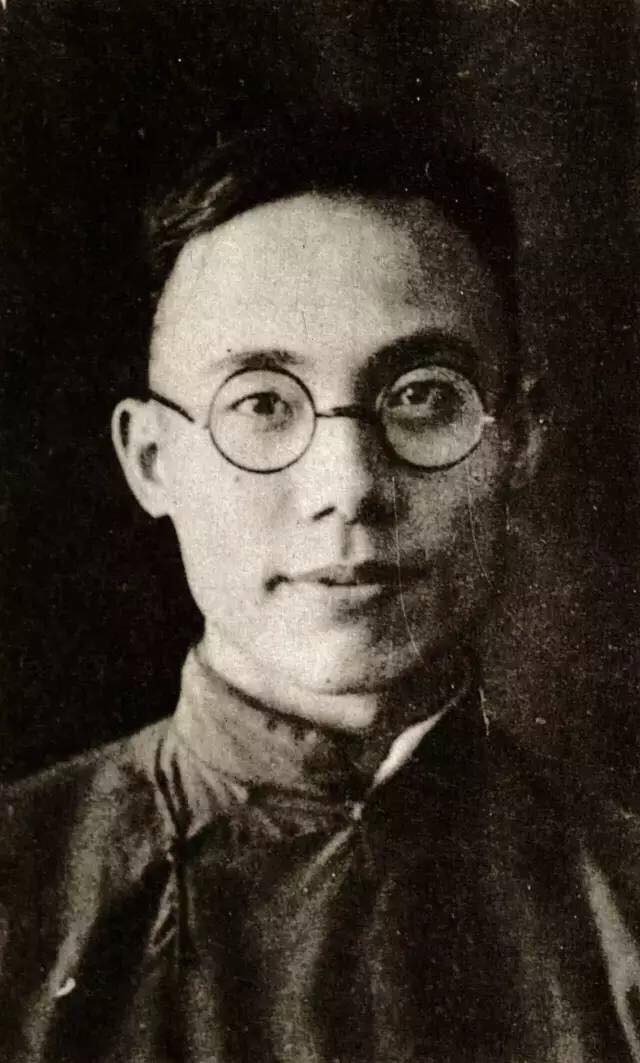
- Fang Ganmin, c. 1930
- Born: 15 February 1906; Wenling, Zhejiang, China
- Died: 21 January 1984 (aged 77); Suzhou
- Known for: Painting, drawing, sculpture
- Movement: Cubism, Chinese Modernism
- Spouse: Su Ailan (蘇愛蘭)

Fang Ganmin
- Traditional Chinese: 方幹民
- Simplified Chinese: 方干民
Transcriptions

Fang Ganmin (simplified Chinese: 方干民; traditional Chinese: 方幹民; 15 February 1906 - January 1984) was a Chinese French-trained painter, sculptor and educator, who was educated in Paris and spent most of his adult life in China. Regarded as one of the pioneers of Chinese oil painting, Fang was born in the Wenling county, Zhejiang province. He began studying painting in 1924 and went to Paris in 1925, enrolling in the École nationale supérieure des Beaux-Arts, making him one of the first-generation Chinese painters to study abroad in France. Upon returning to China, he taught at the National Arts Academy, Hangzhou, becoming a professor at the Western Painting Department. During the Cultural Revolution, Fang was shamed and tortured by the Red Guards, and his works were destroyed. He died in 1984. His students include Zao Wou-Ki, Chu Teh-Chun and Wu Guanzhong.

== Timeline ==
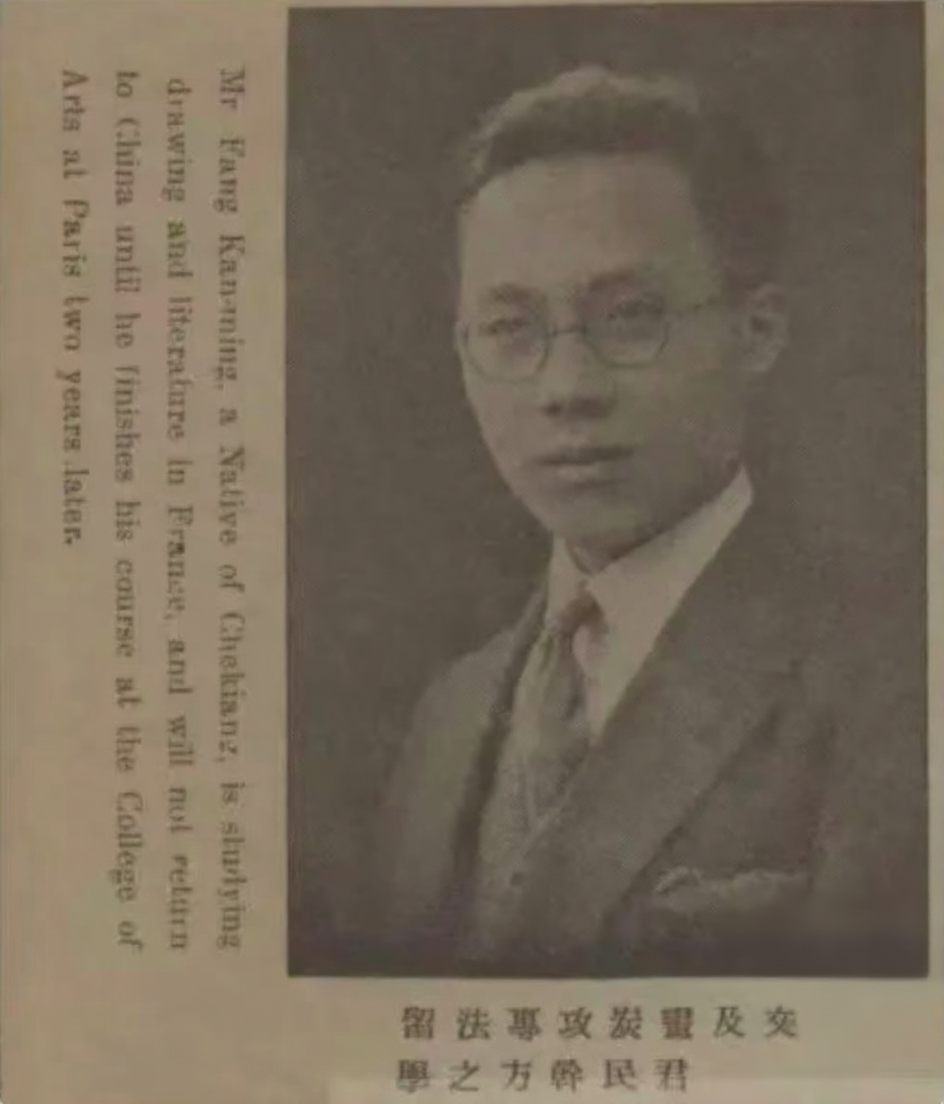
Newspaper clipping in circa 1926

In 1906, Fang Ganmin was born in Wenling, Zhejiang on February 15. His father, Fang Yue (also known as Xun Cheng), was an official literary degree holder, who majored in the study of written characters and published several books including "A Simple Approach to The Study of The Six Classes of Characters".

In 1920, Fang attended Andin High School in Hangzhou, gradually showing his talent in art.

In 1924, he went to Shanghai in the summer to apply for the Shanghai Academy of Fine Arts and was accepted to the second level where he was educated with a solid drawing foundation under the direction of Russian teacher V. Podgursky.

In 1925, he left Shanghai for France to further his studies.

In 1926, after learning the French language at a town outside Paris for six months, Fang was accepted into an art school in Lyon where he took "Paster Casts" and "Future drawing" classes.

In 1927, Fang attended École des Beaux-Arts de Paris and joined Jean-Paul Laurens' studio, together with Yan Wenliang. Apart from taking drawing lessons at the studio, he was also a frequent visitor of galleries and museums and developed a strong interest in post-impressionism.

In 1929, he married Ms. Ai Lan Su, his fellow schoolmate at École des Beaux-Arts, in Paris. He returned to China in the winter and was hired by the Shanghai Private Xin Hua Fine Arts Academy, but later transferred to Shanghai Fine Arts University and Shanghai Academy of Fine Arts. Fang met Su Ailan at the Beaux-Arts in the Humbert Studio (the only one authorised to receive female students). Su Xuelin, the famed female Chinese writer and scholar, was Fang's sister-in-law.

== Career ==
Fang Ganmin studied in Shanghai Meizhuan and under Jean-Pierre Laurens (1875–1932), son of Jean-Paul Laurens (1838 – 1921), at the École nationale supérieure des Beaux-Arts, from 1926 to 1929, together with Chinese artists such as Yan Wenliang. He taught in Xinhua AFA, Shanghai, and Hangzhou Academy.

In or around 1930, Fang Ganmin, along with artists such as Xu Shaozeng, Guo Guni, Li Jingfa and Zhu Yingpeng, founded the Changfeng Society for the Study of Western Paintings. In 1951 and 1952, a campaign against modernist art, condemned in Soviet terms as both bourgeois and formalist, had forced Lin Fengmian and Wu Dayu to leave the art academy in Hangzhou and return to Shanghai. Realism was deemed the progressive style. Fang Ganmin managed to remain, but was nonetheless marginalised and condemned for his modern styles. During the Cultural Revolution, Fang, branded an anti-revoluntary for his modernist artistic style, was paraded around the National Academy of Art in Hangzhou, ink and paint poured over him as students beat and denounced him. Fang was also imprisoned by the Red Guards for long periods (for some periods, together with Pan Tianshou).

Lin Fengmian, Wu Dayu and Fang Ganmin, and their students Chu Teh-Chun, Wu Guanzhong, and Zao Wou-Ki, have been collectively referred to as the "West Lake" school of artists (西湖畫派).

== Works ==
Of Fang's early paintings, two are particularly noteworthy. They are exercises in the Cubist manner, and give to their subject, both nudes, the geometrical and sculptural, but not the fragmented, effect of a picture by Braque. One of them is "Melody in Autumn" (1934). The other is "White Doves" (1932), which portrays geometric shapes suggestive of Cubism, but with an Art Deco-like structural undertone.

In affectionate jest, his students called his style fang ('square'), punning on his surname Fang, which also happens to be one of the characters of the Chinese word for 'cubic'.

== Gallery ==
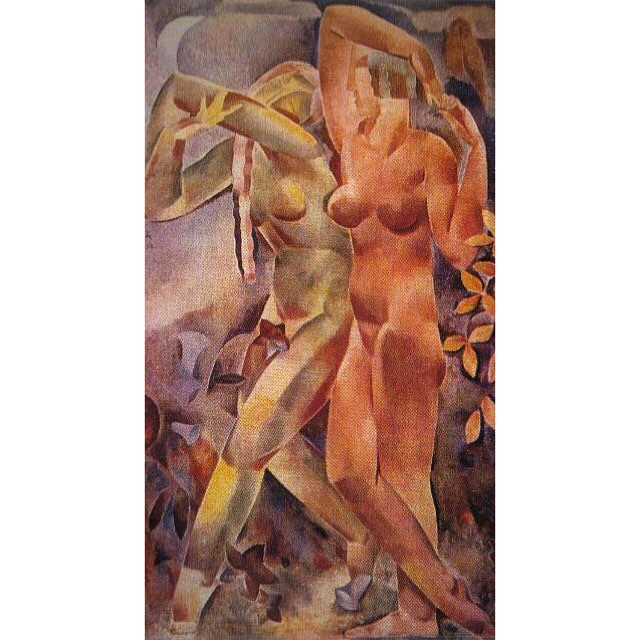
Melody in Autumn, 1934, oil on canvas

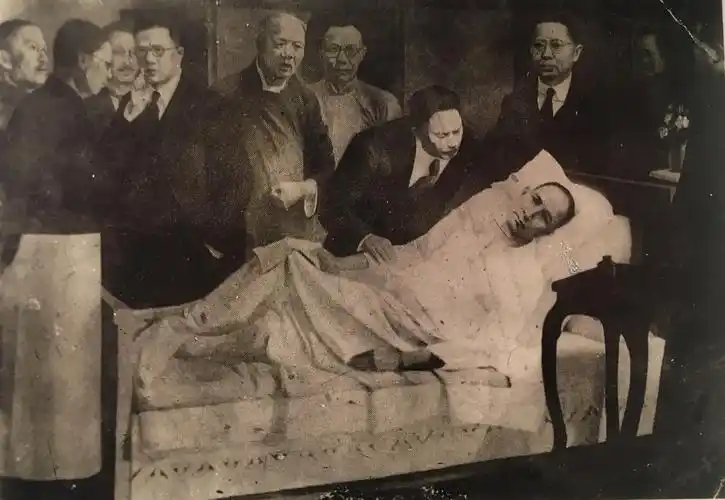
Founding Father's Will, 1937, oil on canvas

Yellow Dragon Cave, 1981, oil on canvas

Scenery in Autumn, 1983, oil on canvas

== Notable students ==
- Chu Teh-chun
- Wu Guanzhong
- Zao Wou-ki
- Min Xiwen
