= Mind Set Art Center =

The Mind Set Art Center (MSAC; Chinese: 安卓藝術; pinyin: Ānzhuó Yìshù) is a contemporary art gallery in Daan District, Taipei, Taiwan, predominantly known for its specialty in representing emerging artists around the world, in particular Taiwanese artists. It was founded in 2010 by Andre Lee.

== Artists ==
Artists shown in the gallery include:

- Jhong Jiang Ze
- Shi Jin-Hua
- Juin Heish
- Tang Jo-Hung
- Yee I-Lann
- Marina Cruz Garcia
- Ana Maria Micu

== Exhibitions ==
- Figure Babel -Patricia Eustaquio (2014)
- The Nameless Hundred -Victor Balanon (2014)
- Between the Visible and the Invisible -Oana Farcas (2014)
- Shiau-Peng Chen Archives -Shiau-Peng Chen (2014)
- 50 -LIN Chuan-Chu (2014)
- Indexing the Moon -Shi Jin-Hua (2013)
- Launching ceremony of SHI Jin-Hua's album and latest work Art Today on view -SHI Jin-Hua (2013)
- Witherland -Hanna Pettyjohn (2013)
- Tree of Life -Shinji Ohmaki (2013)
- In The Skin -YU JI SOLO EXHIBITION (2013)
- Spring Trip -Contemporary Art Group Exhibition -LIN Chuan-Chu‧JHONG Jiang Ze‧SHI Jin-Hua‧SHI (2013)
- A Conscious Choice For Temporary Blindness -ANA MARIA MICU & Cătălin Petrişor (2012)
- REGENERATION a duo show -Shi Jin Hua & Marina Cruz (2012)
- From Single to Dual, From Dual to Single -Juin Shieh (2012)
- Correspondence: Jean-François Gromaire -Jean-François Gromaire (2012)
- Pavilion Garden -Shi Jin Song (2012)
- In the House of Memory –Marina Cruz solo exhibition (2012)
- Ｗhere has he been? -Tang Jo-Hung (2012)
- Horizon-Photography -Yee I-Lann (2011)
- Pass Through a Year -Jin-Hua Solo Exhibition (2011)
- Fluid World -Yee I-Lann (2011)
- Haunt -Huang Liang (2011)
- Fabulous Life with Art -Bill Viola, Takashi Murakami, Valay Shende, Jorge Mayet, Shimura Nobuhiro, Montri Toemsombat, etc (2011)
- Utopia - Asian Contemporary Art Group Exhibition (2010)
- Where is here? -Zhou Yilun (2010)

== Transportation ==
The center is accessible within walking distance north of Taipower Building Station of Taipei Metro.
