= C-Space, Beijing =

Contemporary art gallery in Beijing, China

C-Space Beijing (Chinese: C-空间) is a contemporary art gallery in the artist district of Caochangdi, in Beijing China.

== History ==
C-Space was founded in 2008 by Melle Hendrikse and is dedicated on creating exhibitions with young and emerging or established artists, both from the West and China. In making these combinations, the shows have an extra dimension, they become unique little dialogues between two cultural backgrounds.

=== Selection of Past Exhibitions ===
==== 2010 ====
- In November 2010 it marked China's "first show for Germany's performance and media artist Ulay": Great Walk Talk. It includes works he produced in China from 1986 to 1988.
- From June to September 2010 C-Space brought together two renowned graffiti artists Blade from the U.S. and Zhang Dali from China: From New York to Beijing: Graffiti - Blogging in the Street. "The exhibition at C-Space does not pose specific questions about the complexity of being a street artist in a dictatorship but provides a low-key celebration of the subculture that flourished in New York during the early 1980s."
- April to May 2010: Also Space. "It'd be easy to mistake the exhibition in C-Space for a living quarters, and much of the natural layout of the space has been used in the creation of art, or a place for people to interact." ""I'd like people to feel free to navigate the building. I'd like them to feel free to counter what they're expecting to see and re-appropriate what they're looking for," adds Vanhoe." Also Space is a proposal taking into account the various formats of organizations in the art world such as spaces and exhibitions. What it addresses is that if the formats of spaces, exhibitions and other forms of organizations that we usually see and know existing in the art industry have been accepted arbitrarily and unconsciously as rules, orders, standards and levels of judgments, can we still propose other forms of organizations within the grids of such rules and standards."
- March/ April 2010, Woody van Amen: Language as a medium for Art. "Christened by Western media as the Father of Dutch Pop Art, van Amen became fascinated with Chinese characters after he was diagnosed with cancer in 2003."

==== 2009 ====
- Sagi Groner: The Culture of Make Believe, September/ October 2009. "It consisted of a group of tiny sculptures placed before blue screens. Some of the figures are scenes from well known Hollywood productions (there is one from the Wizard of Oz) while others are representative of Greek/Roman gods." "The pieces were theatrical and engaging."

==== 2008 ====
- Strategies for concealing. November 2008 - February 2009. "C-Space special curator Maria Rus Bojan mounts an exhibition about the popularity of reality TV, and online communities, acting as camouflage that allows viewers to blend into contemporary, mediated surroundings and conceal themselves from the ‘enemy’. This group show consists of photographs, videos, paintings and sculptures subtly hiding desperation, loss and anxiety."

== Artists ==
- Woody van Amen
- Hans van Bentem
- Cang Xin
- Aaron van Erp
- Sagi Groner
- Boukje Janssen
- Ana Maria Micu
- Catalin Petrisor
- Nicolas Provost
- Adriaan Rees
- Marike Schuurman
- Sui Jianguo
- Henk Visch
- Vroegop / Schoonveld
- Carine Weve
- Xing Danwen
- Liu Gang
- Sun Ping
- Zhang Shujian
- Zhang Dali

== Address ==
Red No. 1 – C1 & C2 Cao Changdi Chaoyang District Beijing, 100015, China
