= Zao Wou-Ki =

Chinese-French painter (1920–2013)

- Born: 1 February 1920; Beijing, China
- Died: 9 April 2013 (aged 93); Nyon, Switzerland
- Education: China Academy of Art (Fang Ganmin, Lin Fengmian)
- Known for: Painting, drawing
- Spouse(s): Xie Jinglan (謝景蘭); Chan May-Kan; Françoise Marquet

Zao Wou-Ki
- Traditional Chinese: 趙無極
- Simplified Chinese: 赵无极
Transcriptions
Standard Mandarin
- Hanyu Pinyin: Zhào Wújí
- Wade–Giles: Chao Wu-chi
- IPA: [ʈʂâʊ ǔ tɕǐ]

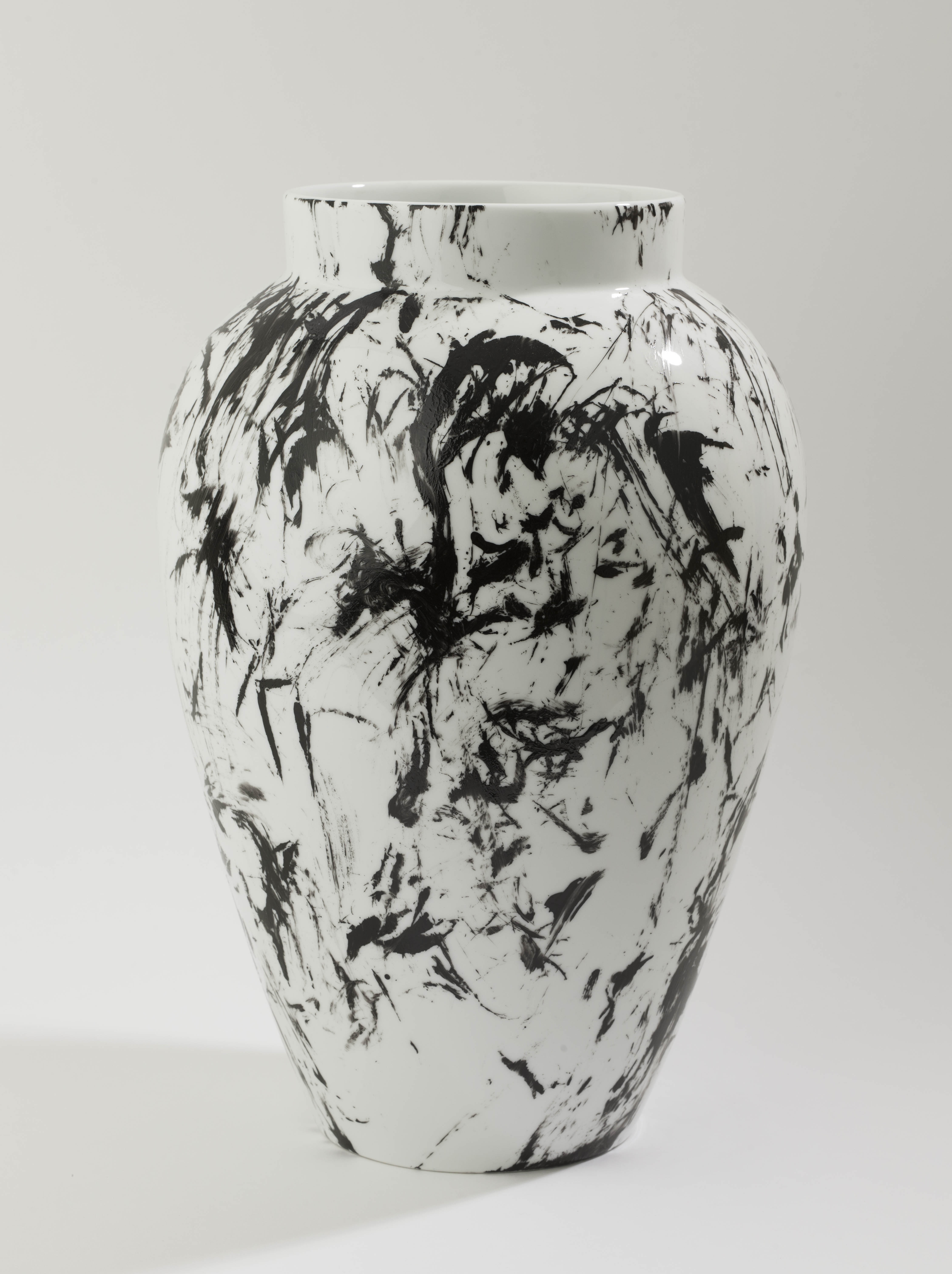
Porcelain vase painted by Zao Wou-Ki in 2006. Musée Cernuschi

Zao Wou-Ki (Chinese: 赵无极; pinyin: Zhào Wújí; Wade–Giles: Chao Wu-chi; 1 February 1920 – 9 April 2013) was a Chinese-French painter. He was a member of the Académie des Beaux-Arts in Paris. Zao Wou-Ki graduated from the China Academy of Art in Hangzhou, where he studied under French-trained Fang Ganmin and Wu Dayu.

== Early years ==
Zao was born in Beijing with family roots in Dantu, Zhenjiang, Jiangsu province. In his childhood he was brought back to his hometown Dantu where he studied calligraphy and gained acceptance to the Hangzhou School of Fine Arts. From 1935 to 1941, he studied painting at the China Academy of Art in Hangzhou, Zhejiang province, where he was taught by Lin Fengmian, Fang Ganmin and Wu Dayu.

== Personal life ==
In April 1948, Wou-Ki went with his wife Xie Jinglan (謝景蘭), a composer, to Paris. He learned French at the Alliance Française and attended the Académie de la Grande Chaumière, where he took classes with Othon Friesz. Soon, the couple found a studio on rue du Moulin-Vert in Montparnasse next door to the Swiss sculptor Alberto Giacometti. Wou-Ki's earliest exhibitions in France were met with praise from Joan Miró and Picasso.

Friends at the time included Norman Bluhm, Jean-Paul Riopelle, Nicolas de Staël, Sam Francis, Pierre Soulages, Maria Helena Vieira da Silva, and Hans Hartung, who would meet at the Galerie Nina Dausset on Rue du Dragon.

In 1949, Zao Wou-Ki won first prize in a drawing competition judged by André Lhote and Marcel Gromaire. His prize was a copy of Histoire de la peinture occidentale (History of Western Painting) published by Albert Skira.

At the Desjobert printing house, Wou-Ki learned the techniques of lithography. In 1950, gallery owner Pierre Loeb visited the painter's studio, brought there by Henri Michaux, who would become a close friend. The painter worked for Loeb from then until 1957. That same year, Zao Wou-Ki took part in the Salon de Mai, where he would exhibit until 1978, and presented his first lithographs at the La Hune gallery.

From 1952, Wou-Ki exhibited regularly in Paris, then in Switzerland in Basel and Lausanne, and in the United States in Washington, Chicago, and New York, demonstrating international recognition. In 1953, Roland Petit called on him to design the sets for the ballet La Perle, based on a theme by Louise de Vilmorin, with music by Claude Pascal and choreography by Victor Gsovsky. It was at this time that a metamorphosis in his art took place, which confused collectors: "My painting is becoming illegible. Still lifes and flowers no longer exist. I am moving towards an imaginary, indecipherable style," he recalled in 1976. For over a year, his dealer did not sell a single painting. On November 22, 1954, a retrospective of the painter's engraved work opened at the Cincinnati Art Museum, with Nesto Jacometti publishing the catalogue raisonné.

In 1955, Zao Wou-Ki befriended the composer Edgard Varèse, to whom he dedicated a painting in 1964. Art Historian Jean Leymarie recounts that the painter became "one of the regulars at the Domaine musical run by Pierre Boulez in 1954, and in December of the same year, he attended the tumultuous performance of Déserts, Varèse's piece in which the intervals of silence are as powerful as the climax of sound. The painter felt an affectionate veneration for this musician, whose musical scope resonated in his work."

Zao and his wife Lalan (artist) (Xie Jinglan) pursued their own careers, their son having stayed in China with Zao's parents. In the mid-1950s, they were divorced. In 1957, Zao decided to visit the United States where his younger brother Chao Wu-Wai was living in Montclair, New Jersey, close to the art scene of New York City. He wanted to learn more about "pop art". While in the US, he painted seven canvases at his brother's house. There are relatively few items dating from that year (1957). Years later, the largest canvas was given by his brother, Chao Wu-Wai, to the Detroit Institute of Arts.

He left the U.S. after a six-week stay, traveling to Tokyo and then to Hong Kong, where he met his second wife Chan May-Kan (陈美琴, May Zao), a film actress who had two children from her first marriage. Under the influence of Zao, she became a successful sculptor. In 1972, she committed suicide at age 41 due to mental illness. In 1972, he also visited his family in China who he had not seen since 1948.

In 1997, he married his third wife Françoise Marquet, who now serves as president of the Zao Wou-Ki Foundation.

== Career ==
Zao's works, influenced by Paul Klee, are orientated to abstraction. He names them with the date in which he finishes them, and in them, masses of colours appear to materialise a creating world, like a Big Bang, where light structures the canvas. He worked formats in triptychs and diptychs. While his work was stylistically similar to the Abstract Expressionists whom he met while travelling in New York, he was influenced by Impressionism. Zao Wou-Ki stated that he had been influenced by the works of Matisse, Picasso and Cézanne.

His meetings with Henri Michaux pushed him to review his Indian ink techniques, always based in Chinese traditional drawings. Zao was a member of the Académie des beaux-arts, and was considered to have been one of the most successful Chinese painters during his lifetime.

In 1982, he was invited to paint for the Fragrant Hills Hotel in Beijing, designed by I. M. Pei. I. M. Pei had a fellowship to Europe in the early 1950s and he met Wou-Ki at Galerie Claude Bernard, the gallery that represented Wou-Ki. In 1983, he returned to his alma mater, the China Academy of Art in Hangzhou to give lectures.

Former French President Jacques Chirac was offered a painting by Zao Wou-Ki by his ministers during their last meeting.

By the end of his life Zao had stopped producing new paintings due to health problems. He died on 9 April 2013 at his home in Switzerland.

== Honours ==
- Grand officier de la Légion d'honneur
- Commandeur de l'ordre national du Mérite
- Officier de l'ordre des Arts et des Lettres
- Praemium Imperiale

== Legacy ==
=== Exhibitions ===
In March 2011, De Sarthe Gallery in Hong Kong hosted the solo exhibition Zao Wou-Ki: Paintings 1950s–1960s for its inaugural opening, showcasing a selection of Zao’s oil works from his postwar career.

Later in March 2015, the gallery held a subsequent mini-retrospective, titled Zao Wou-Ki: Ink and Watercolor, which featured historical works on paper dating back to 1950.

In 2018 the Musée d'Art Moderne de Paris, held an exhibition of around 40 works by Zao.

From September 2023 to February 2024, the China Academy of Art in Hangzhou held an exhibition of almost 200 works of their alumni and former teacher Zao. It consisted of 129 oil paintings of the artist. A floor was devoted to showcase his entire life from birth in China to life in Paris. The exhibition was part of a larger cultural programme attached to the 2022 Asian Games and China–France Year of Culture and Tourism in 2024. Therefore, the exhibition was sponsored by China's Ministry of Culture and Tourism and the Zhejiang government with support of the French and Swiss embassies in China.

=== Art auctions ===
Between 2009 and 2014, the value of his work tripled, leading to a scarcity of paintings and to prices rising even higher.

- In 2017 Zao Wou-ki's 29.01.64 (1964) was sold for HK$202.6m (US$26m) at Christie's in Hong Kong, setting a new auction record for the artist and the world record for an oil painting by any Asian artist. The record for the artist was previously held by 29.09.64, another large painting that was sold for HK$153m (US$19.6m) at Christie's Hong Kong in May 2017.
- In 2018 Juin-Octobre 1985, the largest size that Zao Wou-ki ever worked on, was sold for HK$510m after premium, setting the record for the most valuable painting sold in Hong Kong auctions, as well as the auction record for an oil painting by an Asian artist.

== In popular culture ==
Literary anthropologist Andrew Brandel's book Moving Worlds: Literature, Memory, and Migration in Berlin (Toronto: University of Toronto Press, 2023) uses Zao's 1957 painting Water Music as its cover image. The book cover is designed by Val Cooke.
