= Lin Fengmian =

Chinese painter (1900–1991)

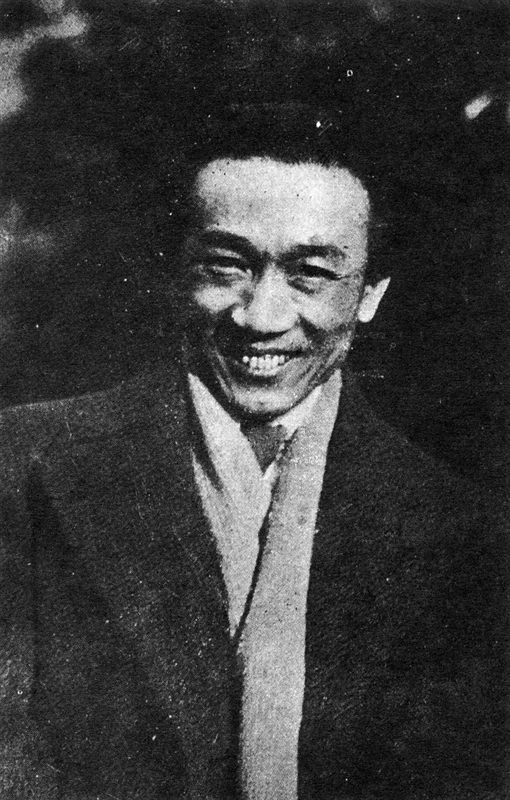
- Born: 22 November 1900; Mei County, Guangdong, Qing China
- Died: 12 August 1991 (aged 90); Hong Kong
- Other name: Lin Fengming
- Known for: Modern Chinese painting
- Spouse(s): Elisa von Roda (m.1924); Alice Vattant (m.1925)
- Parent: Lin Yulung

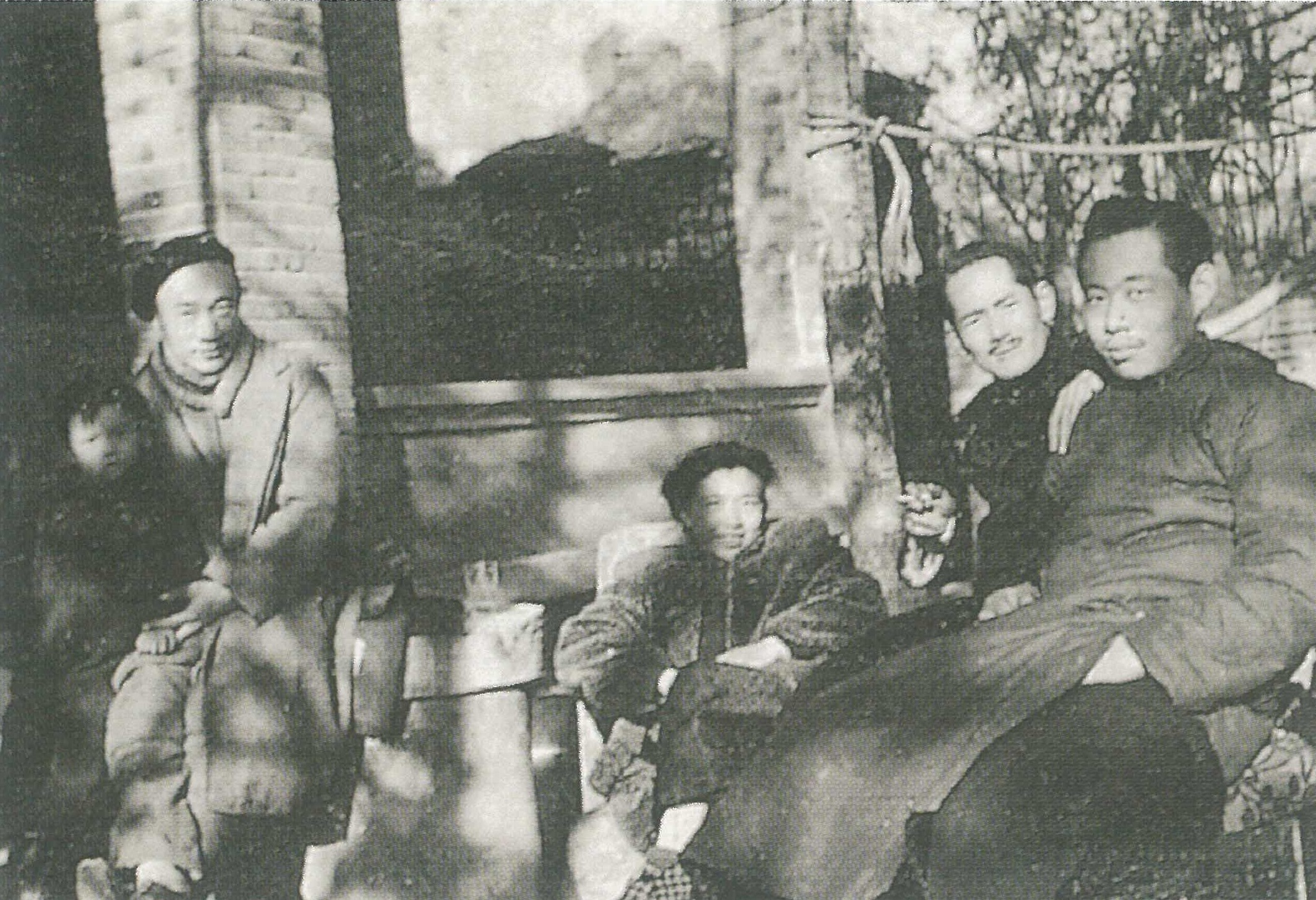
Lin, Lalan, and Zao Wou-ki in 1946

Lin Fengmian (Chinese: 林風眠; November 22, 1900 – August 12, 1991), originally Lin Fengming (林凤鸣), was a Chinese painter and is considered a pioneer of modern Chinese painting for blending Chinese and Western styles; he was one of the earliest Chinese painters to study in Europe. He was also an important innovator in the area of Chinese art education. He was one of the pioneers of Chinese modern art, who earned the title of "The Four Great Academy Presidents".

== Biography ==
Born in Ge Gong Ling village which is located in Meijiang District, Xiyang Baigong Township, in the suburbs of today's Meizhou municipality in Guangdong province, China. His father was a painter and Lin displayed an early fascination for arts and excelled at it. As part of the young Chinese elite, Lin participated in the Diligent Work-Frugal Study Program and went to France. He travelled to Paris with Chinese architect Liu Jipiao and artist Lin Wenzheng and he connected with Chinese artists living in Paris, such as Xu Beihong. Lin spent the early years of his career in Europe, moving to the prestigious Ecole Nationale Superieure des Beaux-Arts in Paris, France in 1920 to study painting in the studio of Fernand Cormon, who also trained other such renowned painters such as Vincent van Gogh, Henri de Toulouse-Lautrec, Emile Bernard, etc. In 1923, he moved to Berlin, Germany for a study tour.

In 1926 he returned to China, where he became the principal of the National Beijing Fine Art School. In 1928, with encouragement from Cai Yuanpei, he founded the Hangzhou National College of Art (now called the China Academy of Art) in Hangzhou, becoming its first principal and taught western painting along with French-trained artists such as Fang Ganmin and Wu Dayu.

Lin's works and life were met with great tragedy. While many of his early works were destroyed by Japanese soldiers during the Sino-Japanese War, many of his later works were destroyed during the Cultural Revolution. After being heavily criticized and denounced by the Gang of Four, a Chinese political faction, Lin personally destroyed his own works by soaking and then flushing his works down the toilet; however, he still ended up being imprisoned for over four years. Zhou Enlai finally approved his release papers. After his release, Lin slowly began to recreate many of his previously destroyed works.

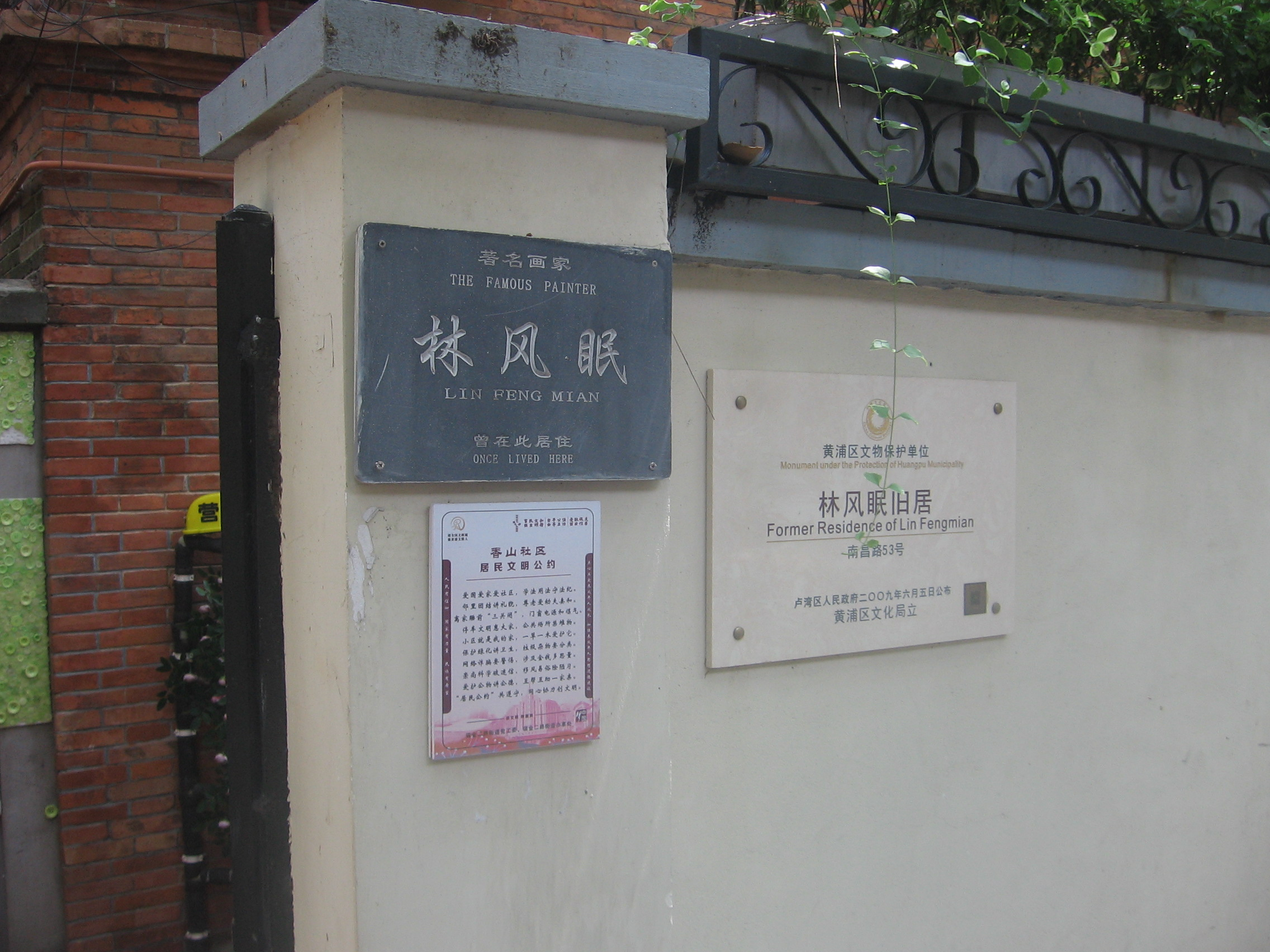
Former Residence of Lin Fengmian in Shanghai

In 1977, thanks to the assistance of Marshall Ye Jianying, who is also from Meizhou, he was allowed to leave China on the assumption that he could reunite with his family in Brazil. He visited his family on several occasions in Brazil but settled in Hong Kong, where he remained until his death in 1991.

Fengmian's artwork is featured in museum art collections, including: The Metropolitan Museum of Art, the Cernuschi museum and the Art Gallery of New South Wales.

In April 2021 Lin's painting The Fiery Battle Of Red Cliffs was sold for HK$9,855,000 at the Sotheby's Spring sales in Hong Kong.

The Metropolitan Museum of Art notes that Lin was drawn to the vivid colors and semiabstract forms of Impressionist and Fauvist painting while studying in France. Early in his career, he moved from oil painting to using Chinese brushes and gouache on paper, seeking the spontaneity associated with Chinese literati painting.

== Artistic style ==
Art historian Sandy Ng says that colour is an important feature of Lin’s work. In his paintings of people, he used colours that did not always match nature to convey emotion. Nude, an oil painting he made in the 1930s that is known through reproductions, shows a woman against blocks of red, orange and yellow separated by dark lines. Ng also sees some Cubist elements in the composition.

Lin played around with combining new European styles with Chinese themes and ways of painting. His painting Farewell My Concubine, which he made in 1959, is a mix of Cubism, Chinese opera, and shadow puppetry. The dramatic quality of the scene is emphasized by the figures’ angular clothes and movements. Ng thinks that Lin is trying to show both time and space in one picture by putting them together like this. In 1978, Lin returned to the same subject in a different way, using flatter geometric shapes and brighter colours.

Taikang Art Museum describes Lin Fengmian’s Landscape as an oil painting from the 1940s. The painting shows green mountains in the distance, a river, trees, and white houses with black roofs. The museum notes that although Lin painted it in oils, he also used techniques from ink painting. Red and yellow foliage contrasts with the green landscape.

== Cote de l'artiste ==
His work "Mare de lotus la nuit" sold for €182,000 at a contemporary art auction in Paris in 2013.
