= Liu Haisu =

Chinese artist (1896–1994)

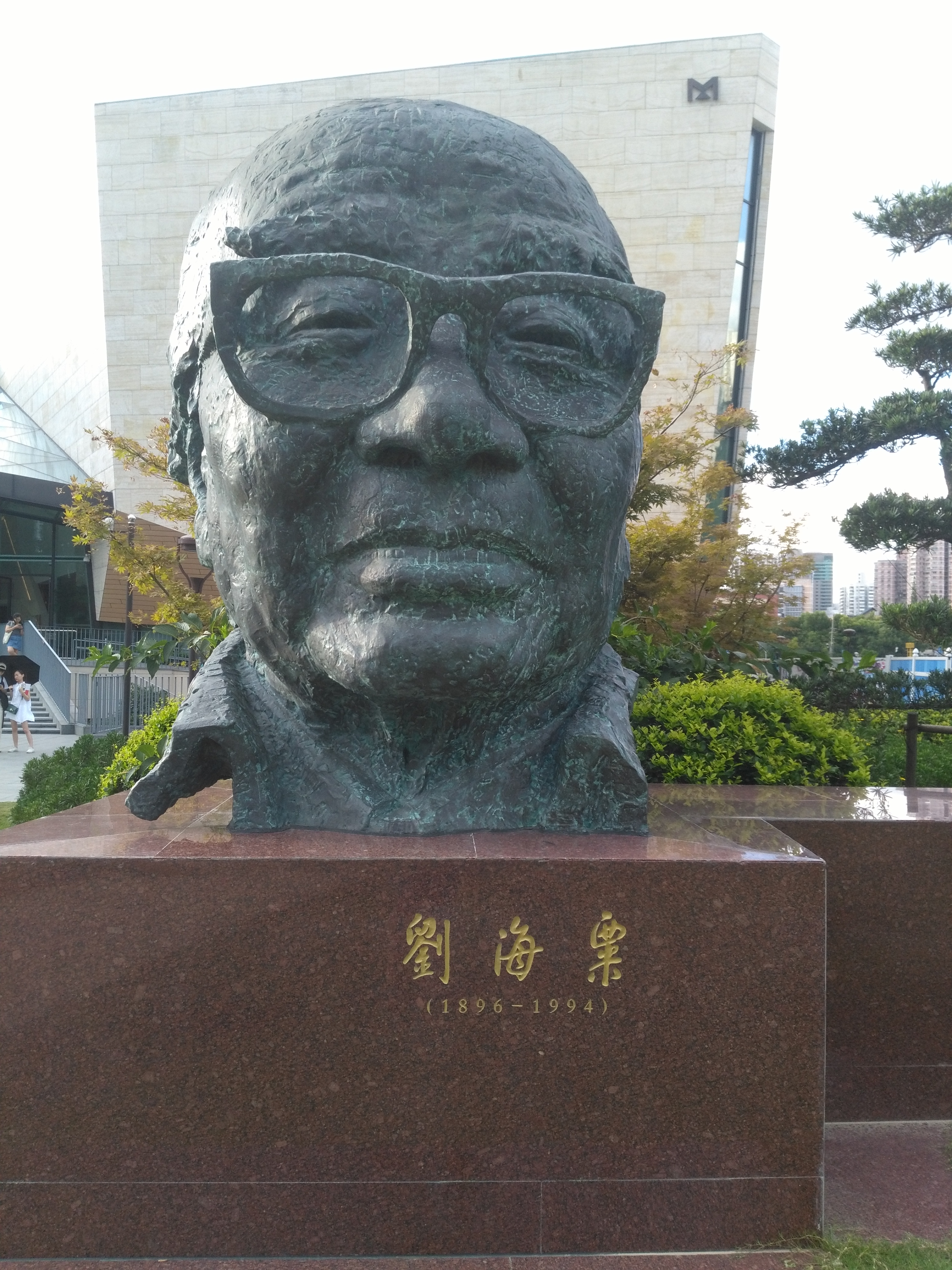
Liu Haisu sculpture by Tang Shichu

Liu Haisu (Chinese: 刘海粟; pinyin: Liú Hǎisù; 16 March 1896 – 7 August 1994) was a prominent twentieth-century Chinese painter and a noted art educator. He excelled in Chinese painting and oil painting. He was one of the four pioneers of Chinese modern art who earned the title of "The Four Great Academy Presidents".

== Overview ==
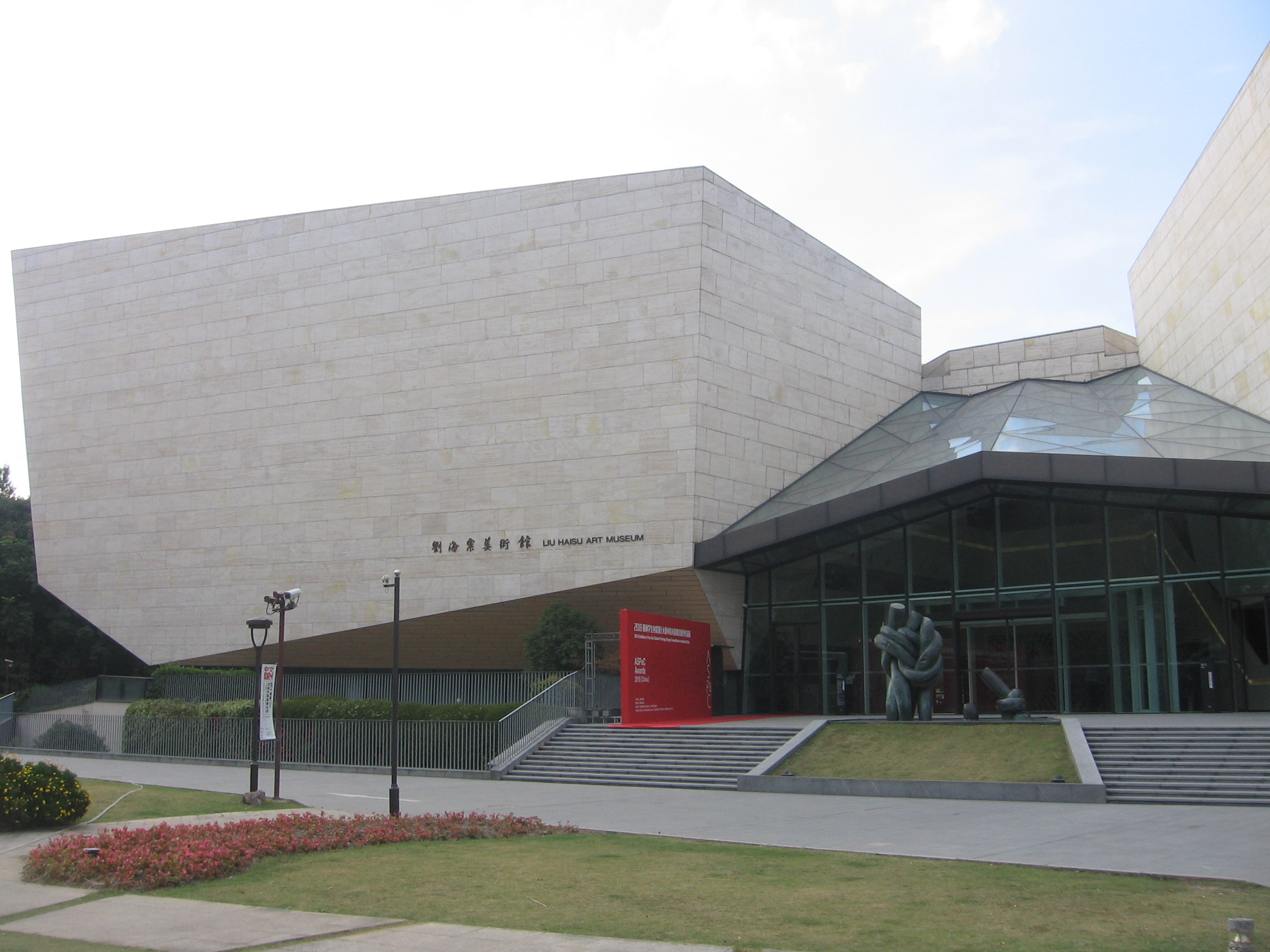
Liu Haisu Art Museum

His original given name was Pan, courtesy name Jifang, and sobriquet Haiwong. He excelled in oil painting, ink painting (guohua) and art education. He was devoted to painting at an early age. He entered a painting school in Shanghai directed by Zhou Xiang to learn western painting when he was 14 years old. In 1910 he opened a painting school in his county. In November 1912, together with Wu Shiguang and Zhang Yunguang, he founded the first school of fine arts in modern China, Shanghai Academy of Chinese Painting (上海国画美术院), the former Shanghai School of Fine Arts (上海美术专科学校). He initiated co-education, and pioneered the adoption of nude model and open-air painting, and thus was scolded as an "artistic traitor", though he was supported by scholars such as Cai Yuanpei. He lectured in Beijing University and held his first personal exhibition in 1918. He went to Japan to explore education of fine arts in 1919, and founded Tianma Party upon returning to China.

He went to Japan in October 1920 to attend the opening ceremony of Imperial Academy of Fine Arts, and after he returned, he wrote "Biography of Jean-François Millet" and "Biography of Paul Cézanne" to introduce western arts into China. He visited Japan again in 1927 and made the acquaintance of Japanese painters.

He was a teacher of Pan Yuliang, a Chinese female artist who brought Western influence into Chinese painting.

== Biography ==
Liu loved painting from a very young age and went to Shanghai for professional studying alone at 14. When he was 17, he established the first art school of modern China—Shanghai institute of Fine Art with his friends, Wu Shiguang and Zhang Jinguang. Later he started coeducation and used nude models to teach paintings. He was the first man to do such things in China and it caused a lot of controversy. People called him a traitor of the arts. However, he got support from Cai Yuanpei, the principal of Peking University. In 1918, he began teaching at Peking University and held his first solo exhibition. In the same year, he also founded the "Art" magazine.

In 1919, he went to Japan to study painting and art education and attended the first art exhibition opening ceremony of the Art School of the imperial Japan. After returning home, he founded an institute—天马会. In 1920, he went to Japan once again. He participated in the opening ceremony of the new imperial Art School on behalf of the arts.

In 1924, one of his students held an exhibition in Nanchang featuring nude art. This greatly disturbed Sun Chuanfang, who issued a secret warrant for Liu's arrest and tried to close down his school. However his efforts were futile, since the school was based in the French area of Shanghai, where Sun had no authority. Liu still had to pay a fine to appease the warlord. The event made the concept of nude modeling public knowledge in China.

In 1927, he was forced to go to Japan because of the political persecution. Asahi Shimbun once assisted him to hold solo exhibitions in Tokyo. In 1938, he went home.

During 1918~1988, Liu climbed Mount Huangshan ten times. His most important works were mostly focused on Huangshan. In addition, he went to Europe twice. He communicated with famous painters, such as Picasso and Matisse. He made great contributions to the development and spread of Chinese painting.

In 1994, he died in Shanghai.

== Family ==
Liu Haisu had four wives in his lifetime. His first marriage was arranged by his parents. He showed great disagreement with the arranged marriage and left home for Shanghai, where he met his second wife—Zhang Yunshi (张韵士), then 17 years old. Soon, they had their first son—Liu Hu (刘虎). In 1933, Liu married Cheng Jiahe (成家和) and had a son (刘麟) and a daughter. In 1944, he married his fourth wife—Xia Yiqiao (夏伊乔), a student of his.
