= China Academy of Art =

Provincial public fine arts college in Hangzhou, Zhejiang, China

Coordinates: 30°14′36″N 120°09′32″E

- 中国美术学院
- Motto: 行健 居敬 汇通 履远
- Type: Public
- Established: 1928; 98 years ago
- President: Gao Shiming (高世名)
- Faculty: 513
- Undergraduates: 7,234
- Location: Hangzhou, China
- Campus: Urban, Suburban
- Colors: Black and white
- Website: caa.edu.cn

China Academy of Art
- Simplified Chinese: 中国美术学院
- Traditional Chinese: 中國美術學院
Transcriptions
Standard Mandarin
- Hanyu Pinyin: Zhōngguó Měishù Xuéyuàn

The China Academy of Art (CAA; 中国美术学院) is a provincial public college of fine arts in Hangzhou, Zhejiang, China. It is affiliated with the province of Zhejiang. The academy is part of the Double First-Class Construction. In the 1960s, the academy was based at Hu Xueyan's Former Residence.

== Notable alumni ==
- Wang Xin, artist
