= China Artists Association =

National association for Chinese artists

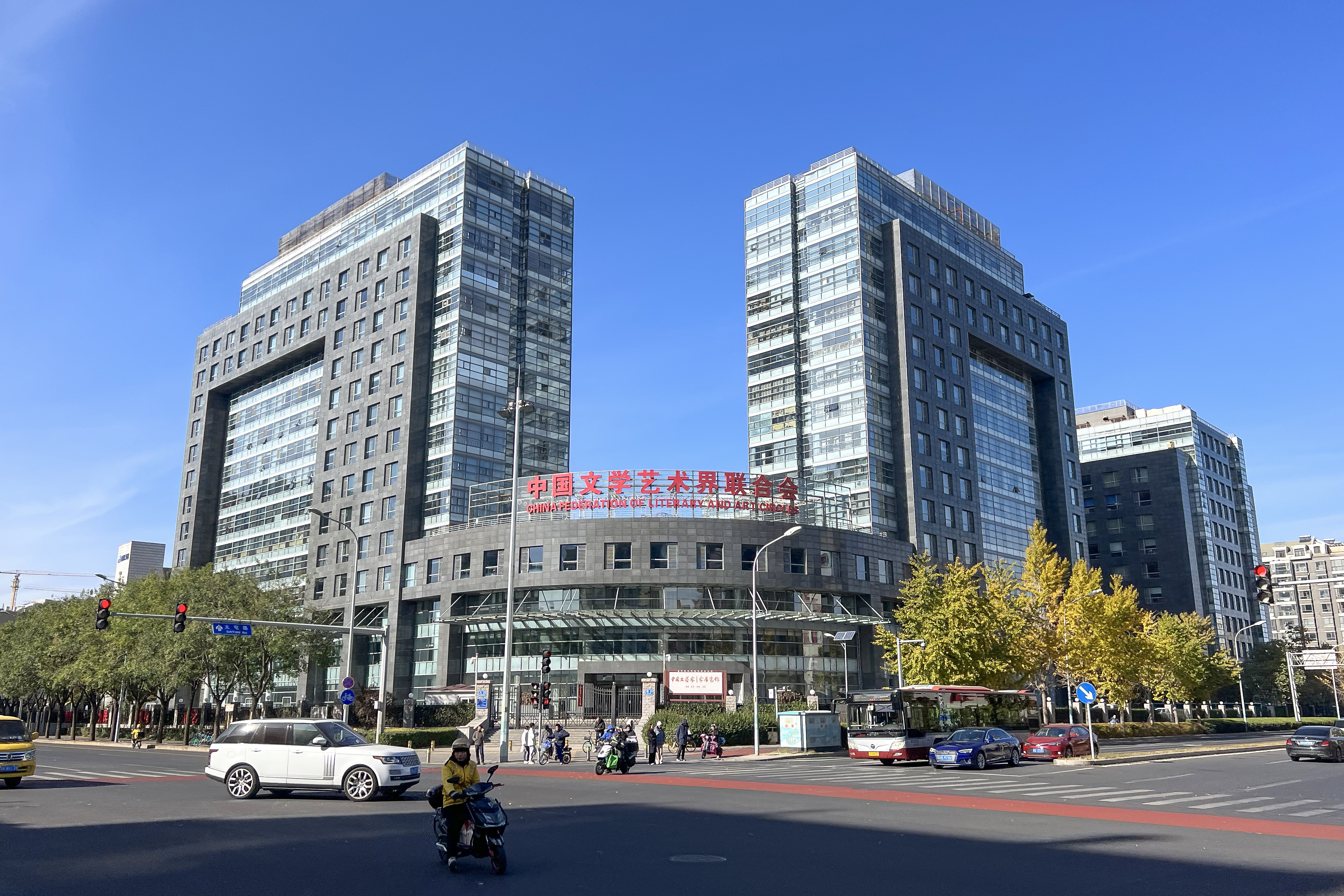
The headquarters in Beijing

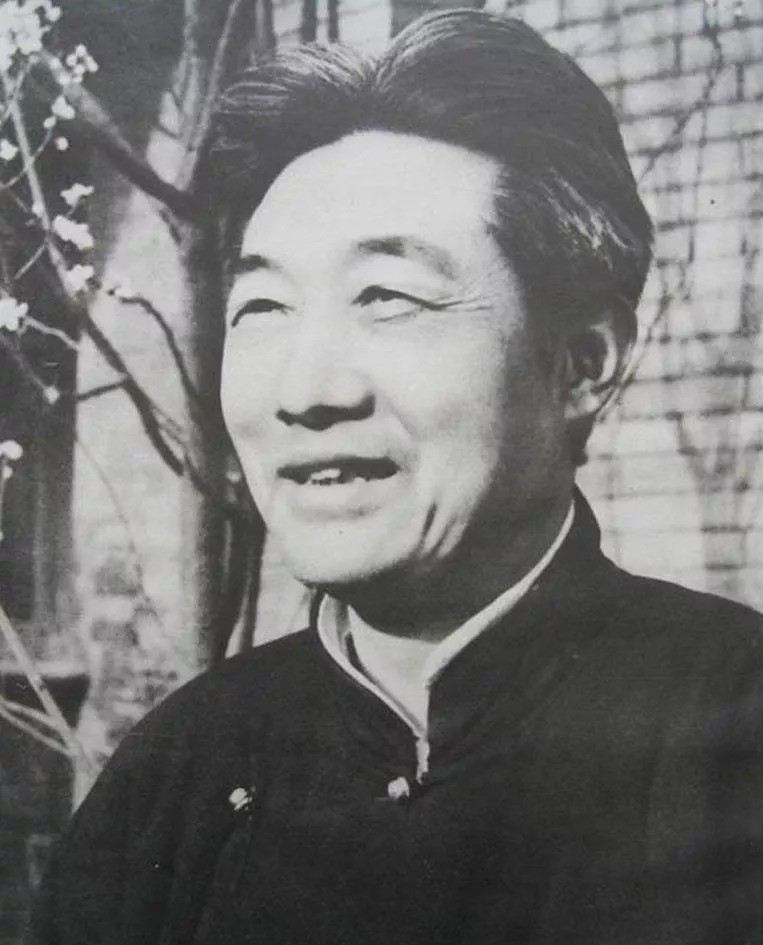
Xu Beihong, the first chairman of the China Artists Association

The China Artists Association (Chinese: 中国美术家协会), originally the China National Art Workers' Association (Chinese: 中华全国美术工作者协会), is the official national association of Chinese artists, with its headquarters in Beijing. It was established in July 1949, with Xu Beihong as its first chairman.

== Organization ==
The China Artists Association is under the leadership of the Secretariat of the Chinese Communist Party, and managed by the Publicity Department of the Chinese Communist Party. It previously operated provincial-level branches in all of China's provinces, autonomous regions, and municipalities, but in 1990 the provincial branches were reorganized into provincial artists associations and admitted into the national association as group members. The national association oversees many specialized subordinate committees, including those for Chinese painting, oil painting, sculpture, architecture, ceramics, print, fresco, animation, ethnic art, and children's art.

The association organizes the national art exhibition, China's largest art exhibition, every five years. Ten sessions have been held as of 2011. Regional artists associations would select works from artists in the local area and submit them to the higher level for consideration. For individual artists, having works selected for the national exhibition brings fame and improves prospects for promotion. Many of them become heads of lower-level artists associations.

The association's headquarters are located in the National Agricultural Exhibition Hall in Beijing. Its official publication is Fine Arts, a monthly magazine.

== History ==
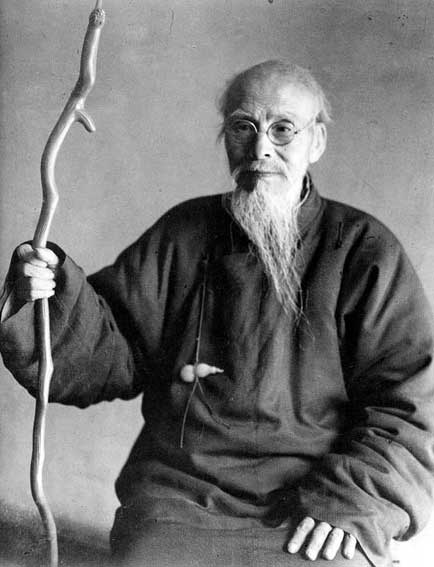
Qi Baishi, the second chairman

The China National Art Workers' Association was established on 21 July 1949 in Beijing's Zhongshan Park. The association's inaugural meeting elected Xu Beihong as its first chairman, with Jiang Feng and Ye Qianyu as vice chairmen. After Xu's death in 1953, a special meeting was held on 4 October, which elected Qi Baishi as the new chairman, and Wu Zuoren and Cai Ruohong 蔡若虹 as vice chairmen, in addition to Jiang and Ye. Hua Junwu 华君武 was elected general secretary. The representatives also passed a resolution to change the organization's name to China Artists' Association.

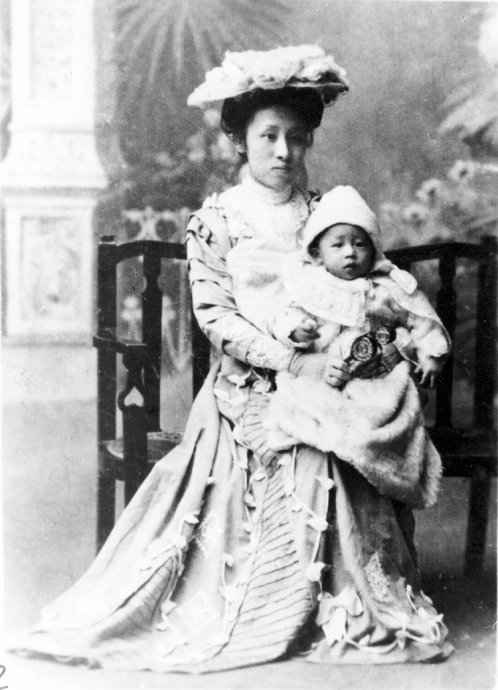
He Xiangning, the third chair and the first chairwoman

The second general meeting was held 30 July 1960 in Beijing. The meeting elected He Xiangning as chairwoman (Qi Baishi had died in 1957), with Cai Ruohong, Liu Kaiqu 刘开渠, Ye Qianyu, Wu Zuoren, Pan Tianshou and Fu Baoshi as vice chairmen. Hua Junwu was re-elected general secretary.

After the interruption of the Cultural Revolution and the death of He Xiangning in 1972, the third general meeting was held on 3 November 1979 in Beijing. Jiang Feng was elected chairman, with Wang Chaowen 王朝闻, Ye Qianyu, Hua Junwu, Liu Kaiqu, Guan Shanyue 关山月, Li Shaoyan 李少言, Li Keran, Wu Zuoren, Huang Xinbo 黄新波 and Cai Ruohong as vice chairmen. After Jiang Feng's death in 1983, the association's standing committee elected Wu Zuoren as chairman in March.

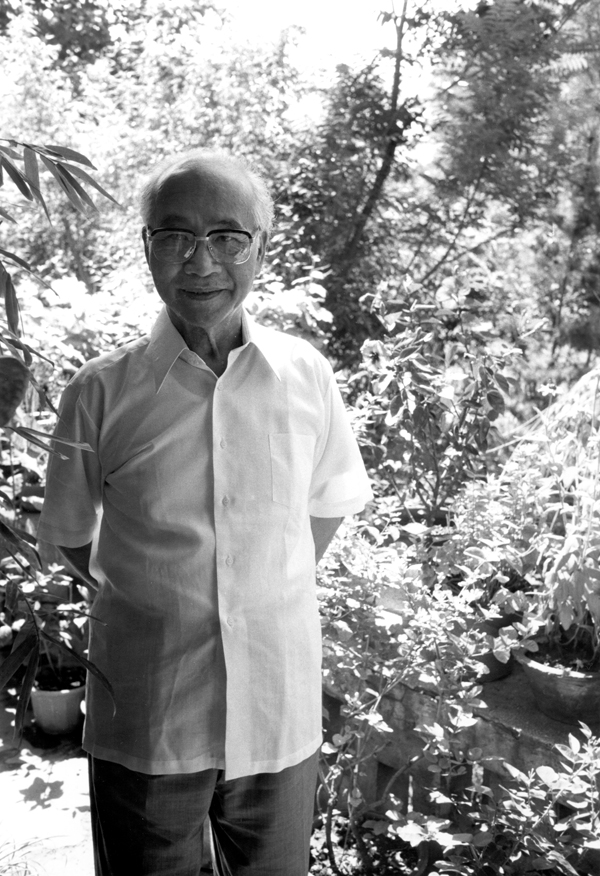
Wu Zuoren, the fifth chairman

On 6 May 1985, the fourth general meeting was held in Jinan. Wu Zuoren was elected chairman, and Wang Chaowen, Ye Qianyu, Gu Yuan 古元, Guan Shanyue, Liu Kaiqu, Hua Junwu, Li Shaoyan, Li Keran, Zhou Sicong 周思聪, Qin Zheng 秦征, Huang Yongyu 黄永玉 and Cai Ruohong as vice chairmen. In October 1990, Wang Qi (王琦) was added as executive vice-chair.

The fifth general meeting was held on 11 September 1998 in Beijing. Jin Shangyi 靳尚谊 was elected chairman, with Liu Dawei 刘大为 (executive vice-chair), Liu Wenxi, Liu Boshu 刘勃舒, Xiao Feng 肖峰, Li Huanmin 李焕民, Lin Yong 林墉, Yang Lizhou 杨力舟, Hazi Aimaiti 哈孜·艾买提, Chang Shana 常沙娜, Cheng Yunxian 程允贤 and Zhan Jianjun 詹建俊 as vice chairs.

The association held its sixth general meeting on 1 December 2003 in Beijing. Jin Shangyi was re-elected chairman, with Liu Dawei (executive), Wang Mingzhi 王明旨, Wang Mingming 王明明, Wei Ershen 韦尔申, Feng Yuan 冯远, Nima Zeren 尼玛泽仁, Xu Jiang 许江, Wu Changjiang 吴长江, Yang Lizhou, Yang Xiaoyang 杨晓阳, Lin Yong, Zeng Chenggang 曾成钢 and Pan Gongkai as vice-chairs. Shi Dawei 施大畏 and Luo Zhongli 罗中立 were added as vice-chairmen in July 2005.

In December 2008, the seventh general meeting was held in Beijing. Liu Dawei was elected chairman, with Wang Mingming, Wei Ershen, Feng Yuan, Xu Jiang, Xu Qinsong 许钦松, Yang Xiaoyang, Wu Changjiang, He Jiaying 何家英, Fan Di'an 范迪安, Luo Zhongli, Shi Dawei, Huang Gesheng 黄格胜, Zeng Chenggang and Pan Gongkai as vice-chairs. Jin Shangyi was named honorary chairman.

The eighth general meeting was held in November 2013 in Beijing. Liu Dawei was re-elected as chairman, with Wang Mingming, Wei Ershen, Feng Yuan, Xu Jiang, Xu Qinsong, Li Xiang 李翔, Yang Xiaoyang, Wu Changjiang, He Jiaying, Fan Di'an, Shi Dawei, Huang Gesheng and Zeng Chenggang as vice-chairs; Xu Li was re-elected as Secretary-General, and Tao Qin and Du Jun as Deputy Secretaries-General.

Since its founding in 1949, the China Artists Association has admitted more than 14,000 members, including 6000 current members.

== List of chairpersons ==
1. Xu Beihong, 1949–1953
2. Qi Baishi, 1953–1957
3. He Xiangning, 1960–1972
4. Jiang Feng, 1979–1983
5. Wu Zuoren, 1983–1997
6. Jin Shangyi, 1998–2008 (honorary chairman 2008–present)
7. Liu Dawei, 2008–2018
8. Fan Di'an, 2018–present
