= Vincent L.J. Deng =

Chinese educator

Vincent L.J. Deng's (simplified Chinese: 邓良军; traditional Chinese: 鄧良軍; pinyin: dèng liáng Jũn) is a Chinese educator. His cultural practices encompass arts, new media and film.

== Career ==
As an arts coordinator, Deng was the exclusive assistant of the I Want To Believe show (2008) of artist Cai Guoqiang, organized by the Solomon R. Guggenheim Museum. As a media supporter he joined the Beijing Olympics, and as assistant president of Unique group and director of Hong Kong Vince Development Co., Ltd., he hosted and participated in Expo Shanghai (2010), coordinating the Turkey, Slovenia, Serbia and Seychelles and European Joint Pavilions.

As an independent curator, he was executive secretary-general of 798 International Art Festival (2009) and curator of Sanlitun's Green Christmas Exhibition. He worked with Tsinghua University Art School to bring new ideas and modern art to China. Deng curated the Chongqing art and home market (2011). He was guest associate professor of Sichuan Fine Arts Institute. As of 2011 he was based in Hong Kong and Chongqing. He was curator of the 2013 Murikami Shanghai Exhibition and Project Director of the 2013 Kengo Kuma Exhibition China.

Deng was a committee member of Chaine des Rotisseurs, chairman of the Arts Working Group of the British Chambers of Commerce, and Hong Kong Chamber of Commerce.

== Essays ==
=== Expo 2010 Shanghai ===
- Turkish Pavilion of Expo 2010, Shanghai, China
- China Aviation Pavilion of Expo 2010, Shanghai, China
- Slovenia Pavilion of Expo 2010, Shanghai, China
- Serbia Pavilion of Expo 2010, Shanghai, China
- European Joint Pavilion of Expo 2010, Shanghai, China
- Seychelles Pavilion of Expo 2010, Shanghai, China

=== Museum ===
- Project Plan of Shanghai "movie city", 2009, Shanghai, China
- China Umbrella Museum, 2009, Hangzhou, China
- Turpan Museum, 2008, Xinjiang, China
- Wedding Theme Park, 2009, Zhuhai, China
- Dalang Planning Exhibition Hall, 2009, Shenzhen, China
- Museum of Chinese Pipe, 2008, Langfang, China

=== Arts ===
- 798 International Art Festival, 2009, Beijing, China
- Sanlitun Green Christmas Exhibition, 2009, Beijing, China
- 798 Turpan Non-heritage Culture week, 2009, Beijing, China
- 798 Beijing Olympics Promotion Week [Ancient Sports and Modern], 2008, Beijing, China
- Hundred Dutch Architecture Exhibition, 2009, CAFA Art Museum, Beijing, China
- 798 Yimo Art Exhibition, 2009, Beijing, China
- Longfor Art & Home Market, 2011, Chongqing, China
- Break Arts Exhibition, 2011, Chongqing, China
- Master Print of Pablo Picasso, 2012, Chongqing, China

=== Media and interviews ===
- "The new step of expo.", Chongqing Morning Newspaper, 25 March 2010, Chongqing, China
- "The question of curator", Artnow Media, 13 October 2010, Beijing, China
- "The young artist brings new market", CHINAADC media, 16 October 2010, Beijing, China

=== Art review ===
- Feedback of Luo Zhongli, Artist, Luo Zhongli
- Who can read Cai Guo-Qiang, Beijing
