= Xu Li =

Xu Li may refer to:

- Xu Li (wrestler)
- Xu Li (computer scientist)
- Xu Li (artist)
