= Yan Xing =

Yan Xing or Yanxing may refer to:

== People ==
- Yan Xing (Han dynasty) (fl. 209–211), military general under the warlord Han Sui
- Yan Xing (artist) (born 1986), Chinese artist

== Historical eras ==
- Yanxing (炎興, 263), era name used by Liu Shan, emperor of Shu Han
- Yanxing (燕興, 384), era name used by Murong Hong, founder of Western Yan
- Yanxing (延興, 471–476), era name used by Emperor Xiaowen of Northern Wei
- Yanxing (延興, 494), era name used by Xiao Zhaowen, emperor of Southern Qi
