= Dong Xiwen =

Chinese painter (1914–1973)

- 董希文
- Born: 1914; Shaoxing, Zhejiang, China
- Died: January 8, 1973 (aged 58–59); Beijing, China
- Occupation: Painter
- Notable work: The Founding Ceremony of the Nation

Dong Xiwen
- Chinese: 董希文
Transcriptions
Standard Mandarin
- Hanyu Pinyin: Dǒng Xīwén
- IPA: [tʊ̀ŋ ɕí.wə̌n]

Dong Xiwen (Chinese: 董希文; pinyin: Dǒng Xīwén; 1914 – 8 January 1973) was a Chinese painter best known for his 1953 work The Founding Ceremony of the Nation.

== Life and career ==
Dong was born in 1914 in the Keqiao district of Shaoxing prefecture in Zhejiang, China. He graduated from Huilan High School in Hangzhou. In 1932, he was admitted to study civil engineering at Zhejiang University. In 1933 and 1934 he attended the Suzhou Art Institute and the Hangzhou National Art Institute. After graduating from the latter in 1939, he attended the Paris Art Institute at Hanoi, Vietnam for half a year. Between 1942 and 1946, he worked as a researcher at the Dunhuang Art Research Institute, copying wall paintings. In 1946 he began to teach at the Central Academy of Fine Arts in Beiping. During this time, he sympathized with the student political activities of the Chinese Communist Party, and participated in activities leading to the takeover of Beiping. In July 1949, he participated in painting the first portrait of Mao Zedong at Tiananmen. In December of the same year, he joined the Communist Party.

Dong was a professor at the Central Academy of Fine Arts. He led the drafting of the relief sculptures for the Monument to the People's Heroes. He was also a member of the second Chinese People's Political Consultative Conference. In 1962 he set up a studio in the Academy with Wu Zuoren and Luo Gongliu. In 1969, he was politically persecuted and made to perform labor. He died of cancer on 8 January 1973.

=== The Founding Ceremony of the Nation ===
Between 1952 and 1953, he painted his best-known work, The Founding Ceremony of the Nation. The painting was first exhibited in 1953.

Following an internal conflict (the Gao Gang Affair) within the Communist Party, Dong produced a revised version of the painting in 1955 which replaced Gao Gang with a flower pot. In 1967, Dong was ordered to remove Liu Shaoqi from the painting; Dong turned the figure of Liu into Dong Biwu. Dong reportedly refused to add Lin Biao to the painting because Lin had not been present for the historical moment.

Later, two students of Dong made further revisions to the painting, creating a replica to avoid damage to the original.

In 1979, another artist revised the replica to paint back in all the figures which had been previously removed.

== Legacy ==
Dong was an expert in portraiture. His oil paintings combined Western techniques of realism from the Renaissance with the ornamental tastes of Chinese traditional painting, including the bright colors of the Dunhuang wall paintings, in keeping with popular tastes.

The painting became a source for the "Red Light" movement during the Cultural Revolution.

== Works ==
- Oil paintings: 《苗女赶场》(1943), 《哈萨克牧羊女》(1947), 《迎接解放》(1949), The Founding Ceremony of the Nation《开国大典》(1953), 《春到西藏》(1954), 《密云春水》(1964).
- Collected works: 《长征路线写生集》, 《董希文画集》, 《董希文素描集》。
- Art criticism:《从中国绘画的表现方法谈到油画中国风》, 《素描基本练习对于彩墨画教学的关系》, 《绘画的色彩问题》。
