= Tang Huawei =

Chinese painter (born 1972)

Tang Huawei (Chinese: 唐华伟; pinyin: Táng Huáwěi; born 16 May 1972) is a Chinese painter known for his oil paintings of landscapes.

== Biography ==
Tang was born in 1972 in Hunan Province. He moved to Beijing in 1990, where he studied at the China Central Academy of Fine Arts under the painter Feng Fasi (冯法祀). He then studied at the graduate school of the Chinese National Academy of Arts (中国艺术研究院). He once cooperated with Feng in the large oil painting, "Ethos-Live Paintings of Mount Huangshan", by Xu Beihong and his students (see in Living an Artistic Life-Feng Fasi, the Oil Painting Master of 20th Century, an album of national collections and donations of the National Art Museum of China, edited by Fan Di'an).

In 2015, Tang organized an exhibition of his oil painting that traveled to Taipei, Germany and Singapore.
