= Carol Yinghua Lu =

Chinese art critic and curator (born 1977)

- Born: Chaozhou
- Education: Malmö Art Academy
- Occupations: art curator, art critic

Carol Yinghua Lu is a curator, art critic and writer who lives and works in Beijing.

== Early life ==
Lu was born in Chaozhou, Guangdong, China, in 1977. Lu graduated from the critical studies programme of Malmö Art Academy at Sweden’s Lund University in 2005 and served as a China Researcher for Asia Art Archive from 2005 to 2007.

== Career ==
Lu is a contributing editor at Frieze (magazine), a London-based art magazine, co-founder and co-editor of Contemporary Art & Investment magazine, and sits on the editorial board for the Arnolfini Art Center’s Far West magazine.

Lu writes essays on contemporary art research for many international art journals and magazines, including e-flux journal, The Exhibitionist, Yishu, and Tate. Her texts on contemporary art have also appeared in many art catalogues, books, publications, and critical readers. Lu's writing focuses on providing documentation of contemporary art trends in Asia, as well as reflection on the impact of political, financial and creative conditions on Asia's artists, critics, curators and gallerists.

In 2007 she was one of three curators of the 7th Shenzhen Biennale, titled "Accidental Message: Art Is Not A System, Not A World". Lu, along with her colleagues Liu Ding and Su Wei focused on experimental art practice in China since 1989 to 2000 to shape an observation of a local history. From 2009-2010, Lu directed a project space for the Today Art Museum. And in 2011 she curated the project "Little Movements: Self-Practices in Contemporary Art", with Liu Ding initiated, that was exhibited at the OCT Contemporary Art Terminal in Shenzhen, and went on an international tour from 2012.

In 2011 Lu was part of the selection panel for the 54th Golden Lion Award at the Venice Biennale. In 2012 she was a Co-Artistic Director of ROUNDTABLE: The 9th Gwangju Biennale (Korea, 2012).

She has curated exhibitions with artists such as Louise Bourgeois, Francesco Clemente, Béatrice Cussol, Chen Man, Jan Saudek, Rosemarie Trockel, Andy Warhol, Gao Yu, Zhuang Hui, Chen Shaoxiong, Leng Wen, Yan Xing, Lu Zhengyuan, Martha Rosler, Gao Shiming, the Raqs Media Collective, Hu Fang, and Dan'er. Lu's book on the work of Chinese artist Wang Yin (born 1964) situates his work within the historical context of twentieth-century Chinese painting, as well as broader shifts in modern Chinese culture.
