= Liu Dawei =

Chinese painter (born 1945)

- 刘大为

President of the China Artists Association
- In office 13 December 2008 – 2018
- Preceded by: Jin Shangyi
- Succeeded by: Fan Di'an

Personal details
- Born: 22 October 1945 (age 80) Weifang, Shandong, China
- Party: Chinese Communist Party
- Education: Inner Mongolia Normal University; Central Academy of Fine Arts

Chinese name
- Simplified Chinese: 刘大为
- Traditional Chinese: 劉大為
Transcriptions
Standard Mandarin
- Hanyu Pinyin: Liǘ Dàwéi

Liu Dawei (born 22 October 1945) is a Chinese painter who is a professor at the People's Liberation Army Academy of Art. He was president of the China Artists Association between 2008 and 2018.

== Biography ==
Liu was born in Weifang, Shandong, on 22 October 1945, while his ancestral home is in Zhucheng. After the establishment of the Communist State, in 1951, his family moved to Baotou. As a child he developed an interesting in painting and studied calligraphy with his grandfather. In September 1963, he was accepted to Inner Mongolia Normal University, majoring in the Department of Arts. After graduating in December 1968, he was dispatched to Baotou Semiconductor Device Factory as a fitter. In 1972, he was transferred to Baotou Daily as an art editor and journalist. In September 1978, he was admitted to the Central Academy of Fine Arts, studying paint under Li Keran, Li Kuchan, and Wu Zuoren. He became president of the China Artists Association in 2008, and served until 2018.

He was a member of the 11th National Committee of the Chinese People's Political Consultative Conference.

Cultural offices
Preceded by Jin Shangyi	President of the China Artists Association; 2008–2018	Succeeded by Fan Di'an
