= A Ge =

Chinese woodcut print artist (born 1948)

- 阿鸽
- Born: 1948 (age 76–77); Liangshan, Sichuan
- Education: China Artists Association
- Spouse: Xu Kuang
- Website: age.artron.net

A Ge (Chinese: 阿鸽; pinyin: Ā Gē; born 1948), also known as Deng Mingying (邓明英), is a Chinese woodcut print artist from Liangshan in Sichuan province and is a member of the Yi people ethnic minority.

== Life ==
Per government policy towards ethnic minorities, A Ge was recruited at age twelve to attend the Sichuan Fine Arts Institute and was encouraged to create art to publicize Yi minority culture and help development.

In 1964 she graduated from the national minority class at the Sichuan branch of the China Artists Association. She is married to Xu Kuang.

== Career ==
A Ge is a Grade 1 National Artist, a member of the China Artists Association and the Chinese Engravers Association, and is chairman of the Sichuan Artists Association, and the vice chairman of the Sichuan federation of literary and art circles, the director of the Shenzhou printmaking museum, and the vice President of the printmaking institute of the Chinese national academy of painting. Her works have been collected by the British Museum in London.

== Works ==
Selected works:

- 《阿鸽版画》 (Prints of A Ge)
- 《四川少数民族画家画库·阿鸽》 (Sichuan Minority Artists Gallery - A Ge, 1995)
- 《阿鸽作品集》(Collection of A Ge's Artwork - A Ge, 2010 Sichuan Art Publishers)
