= Xiao Tao Sheng =

Chinese painter (born 1946)

Xiao Tao Sheng (萧涛生) (born 1946) is a Chinese painter who specializes in portraying Chinese culture through his Western-style oil paintings, known as East in West paintings. He is a class I painter and professor, and currently the vice director of the Sichuan Provincial Art Museum. He is a member of the China Artists Association.

Xiao's artworks were introduced to the public by China Central Television (CCTV), Sichuan TV and Chengdu TV. Most of his award-winning paintings have been selected for national exhibitions in China and abroad, including the International Arts City, Paris in December 2003 and at the South Lobby of the United Nations Secretariat, New York in January 2005. Publications about his work, namely, Collection of Sketches by Xiao Tao Sheng and Collection of Oil Paintings by Xiao Tao Sheng have been included in the collections of the U.S. Library of Congress, New York City's Columbia University Library and the Chinese University of Hong Kong. His works had also been published in art magazines in China, Japan, Hong Kong, the United States and Canada.
