= Sichuan Fine Arts Institute =

University of fine arts in China

Coordinates: 29°36′10″N 106°17′51″E

- 四川美术学院 四川美術學院
- Motto: Close to life, to serve the people; knowledge as equally important, new incentives; open-minded and keeping up with the times
- Type: Public fine arts university
- Established: 1940
- Students: ~8,000
- Undergraduates: 24 programs
- Location: Chongqing, China
- Campus: Traditional campus in Jiulongpo District; new campus built in Huxi District (2005)

Sichuan Fine Arts Institute (SCFAI) (simplified Chinese: 四川美术学院; traditional Chinese: 四川美術學院; pinyin: Sìchuān měishù xuéyuàn) is a public fine arts university established in 1940 in the southwest City of Chongqing, China. It is one of the so called "Great Eight Fine Arts Academies" in China.

== History and reputation ==
Sichuan Fine Arts Institute has a history in the creation of art and research. Artwork has been created by the teachers at SCFAI.

In the 1950s and 1960s, the institute was symbolized by handcraft arts. In the 1970s, it was sculpture, especially the most famous group statues, the "Rent Collecting Courtyard". In the 1980s, it was oil painting, such as SCFAI's president Luo Zhongli's masterpiece "My Father", etc.

The institute enjoys prestige domestically and internationally. The artwork has contributed to contemporary Chinese art. Since the 1990s, many teachers and students have won national and international awards. Artists from SCFAI have exhibited their art internationally.

SCFAI has been establishing cultural exchange relations with more and more foreign art institutes, delegations, and artists, dispatching students to study abroad and receiving foreign students to study at SCFAI. This outreach has resulted in the promotion of international art exchanges and development. These outstanding artists make contributions to the development of fine arts in China.

The traditional campus was in the district of Jiulongpo, in Chongqing. The new campus was built in Huxi District, Chongqing, in 2005.

The university's philosophy is "close to life, to serve the people; knowledge as equally important, new incentives; open-minded and keeping up with the times". The overall development objective is to provide the highest level of art education in the western region of China.

== Departments ==
Programs of study at SCFAI include craft art, oil painting, sculpture, design, architecture, printmaking, art theory, and traditional Chinese painting. (The institute no longer offers Chinese language classes for international and exchange students as a second language at the Huxi campus.)

Sichuan Fine Arts Institute, a public art university administered by the Chongqing municipal government, offers 24 undergraduate programs. Of these, 18 have been designated as national first-class disciplines, and all 24 are recognized at the municipal level. These programs are distributed across 12 schools, including Chinese Painting and Calligraphy, Fine Arts, Arts and Humanities, Art Education, Design, Experimental Art, Architecture and Environmental Art, Film and Animation, Public Art, Marxism, General Education, and Aesthetic Education. The institute enrolls approximately 8,000 students across undergraduate, master's, doctoral, and international programs.

== Alumni ==
The following at alumni of the Sichuan Fine Arts Institute:

- A Ge (born 1948), Yi woodcut print artist
- Qionghui Zou
- Yin Haixin
- Zhang Xiaogang (born 1958), Chinese symbolist and surrealist painter
- Luo Zhongli (born 1948), contemporary Chinese oil painter and former dean of the Sichuan Fine Arts Institute
- Fu Wenjun (born 1955), contemporary artist specializing in digital pictorial photography
- Yan Xing (born 1986), Chinese interdisciplinary artist who works in performance, video, photography, and installation
- Yang Na (born October 1982), Chinese surrealist oil painter and bronze sculptor

== See also ==
- Chengdu Art Academy
