= Fu Wenjun =

Chinese contemporary artist

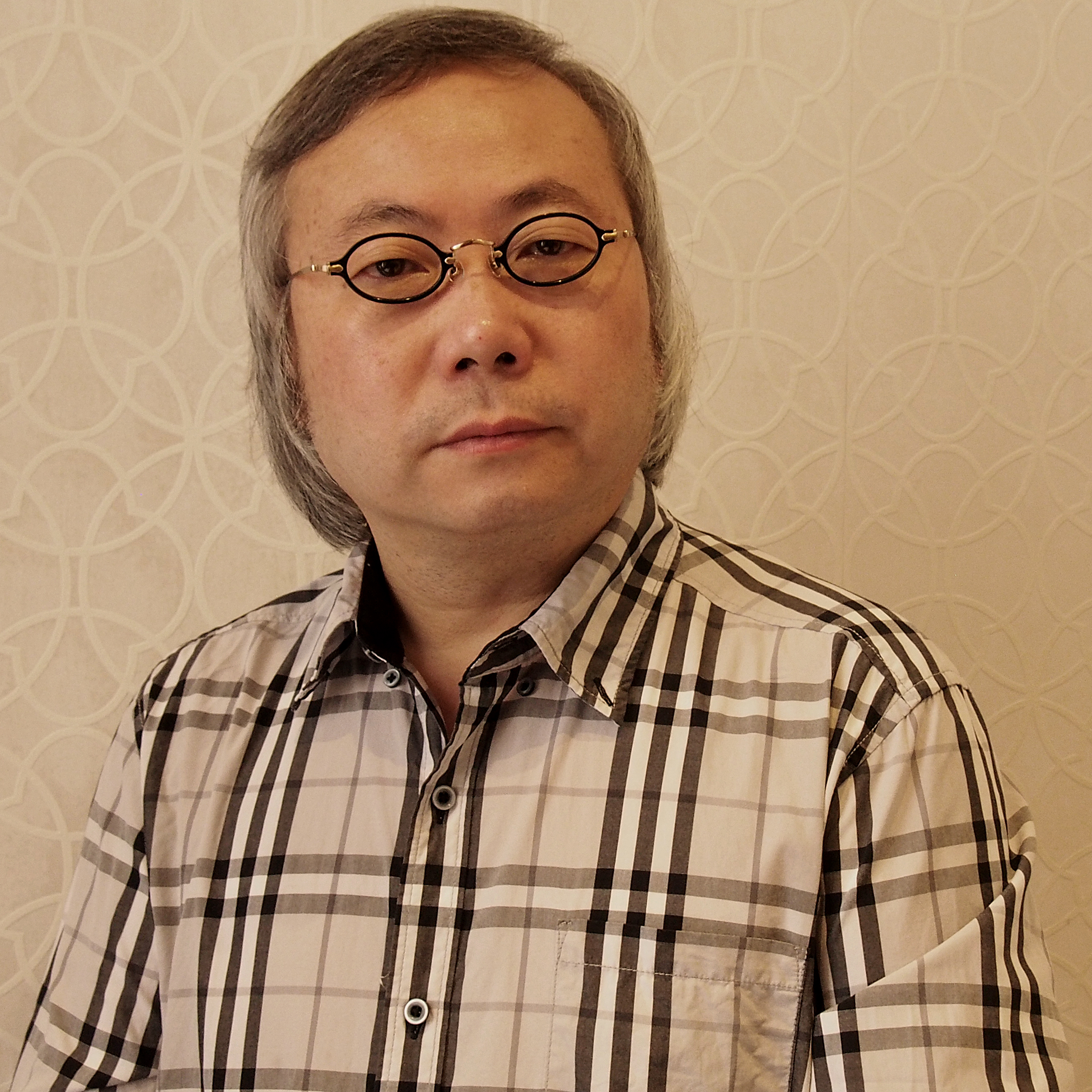
Fu Wenjun

Fu Wenjun (Chinese: 傅文俊; pinyin: Fù Wénjùn, born 1955) is a contemporary artist who works on photography, digital art, installation art, sculpture, and oil painting. He graduated from Sichuan Fine Arts Academy, and currently lives and works at Chongqing. He has developed his concept and practices of "Digital Pictorial Photography" art style, which involves oil painting, photography, and digital art.

His works embody his thinking and reflection on many issues related to the Eastern and Western history, culture and humanity, including the relationship between different cultures in the context of globalization, the heritage of traditional Chinese culture in a rapidly changing society, industrialization and urbanization in Chinese cities.

== Main exhibitions ==
=== Main solo exhibitions ===
- 2010: Spirit Icon, Old Summer Palace, Beijing.
- 2010: Story of Two Parks, Chongqing Library, Chongqing.
- 2010: Show of Formality II, Move the Old Summer Palace 1400 km South, Fei Contemporary Art Center, Shanghai.
- 2010: Show of Formality, Fu Wenjun's Photographic Exhibition of Historical Concept, Today Art Museum, Beijing.
- 2013: Thought Reading, Fu Wenjun Conceptual Photography Exhibition, Miami, FL.
- 2014: Conceptual photographic show of Illusory Metamorphoses grass cloth collection, Miami, FL.
- 2015: Photographic Narrative, Fu Wenjun's Conceptual Photography Solo Exhibition. United Nations Headquarters, New York City, FL.
- 2015: 迷思之像 Thoughtful images. Guangdong Museum of Art, Guangzhou; 1–14 October 2015.
- 2017: Harmony in Diversity Fu Wenjun's Digital Painting Photography Exhibition. National Art Museum of China, Beijing, China.
- 2017: Introspection of Soul Artistic Expression in the Digital Pictorial Photography of Wenjun Fu. Museu Europeu d'Art Modern, Barcelona, Spain
- 2018:"Is It Photography – Fu Wenjun Digital Pictorial Photography Solo Exhibition", Dairy Arts Center, Boulder, USA
- 2019:"Digital Brush: The Photographic Process of Fu Wenjun", The University of Hong Kong, Hong Kong
- 2019 "Again Enter the Scene --- Fu Wenjun Digital Pictorial Photography Exhibition", Chongqing Art Museum, Chongqing, China
- 2020 "Mind Follows the Heart: Fu Wenjun Exhibition", Art Bund Puxi Museum, Shanghai, China

== Collection ==
His artworks are collected by Museu Europeu d'Art Modern, National Art Museum of China, Today Art Museum, University Museum and Art Gallery The University of Hong Kong, the Old Summer Palace Museum, Tokyo Metropolitan Art Museum, Kennedy Family, World Council of Peoples for the United Nations, Dazu Grotto Museum, Chongqing Art Museum, Guangdong Museum of Art, Société Nationale des Beaux Arts of France, Egypt Ahmed Shawki Museum and others.
