= Fan Di'an =

Former Director of National Art Museum of China

- 范迪安

President of the China Artists Association
- Incumbent
- Assumed office 2018
- Preceded by: Liu Dawei

President of Central Academy of Fine Arts
- Incumbent
- Assumed office 2014
- Preceded by: Pan Gongkai

President of the National Art Museum of China
- In office December 2005 – September 2014
- Preceded by: Feng Yuan
- Succeeded by: Wu Weishan

Personal details
- Born: September 1955 (age 71) Nanping, Fujian, China
- Party: Chinese Communist Party
- Education: Fujian Normal University; Central Academy of Fine Arts

Fan Di'an (Chinese: 范迪安; pinyin: Fàn Dí'ān; born September 1955) is a Chinese painter currently serving as president of the Central Academy of Fine Arts and China Artists Association.

== Biography ==
Fan was born in Fujian in September 1955. He secondary studied at Pucheng County No.1 High School. During the late Cultural Revolution, he was a sent down youth between 1973 and 1977. After the resumption of college entrance examination in 1977, he was accepted to the Fujian Normal University. After graduation, he taught at the university. He joined the Chinese Communist Party in April 1979. In 1985, he was admitted to Central Academy of Fine Arts, and worked at the university since 1988. He was a visiting scholar at the University of Victoria from 1992 to 1993. In 2005, he was appointed president of the National Art Museum of China. After this office was terminated in 2014, he became president of the Central Academy of Fine Arts. In December 2018, he was elected president of the China Artists Association.

He was a member of the 11th, 12th, 13th National Committee of the Chinese People's Political Consultative Conference.

Cultural offices
Preceded by Feng Yuan	President of the National Art Museum of China; 2005–2014	Succeeded by Wu Weishan
Preceded by Liu Dawei	President of the China Artists Association; 2018–present	Incumbent
Educational offices
Preceded by Pan Gongkai	President of Central Academy of Fine Arts; 2014–present	Incumbent
