= Xu Li (artist) =

Chinese artist (born 1961)

- 徐里
- Born: 1961 (age 64–65); Fujian, China
- Education: Fujian Normal University; Southwest Normal University
- Occupation: Artist
- Years active: 1981–Present
- Website: https://xl.artron.net/

Xu Li (Chinese: 徐里; 1961) is a Chinese artist. He is currently standing vice chairman of the China Artists Association; deputy director of the Organizing Committee for the Fine Arts on Subjects of Chinese Civilization and History Creative Project; and member of the China Artists Association council. He has also been a doctoral supervisor and professor at Jimei University and the Chinese National Academy of Arts. His works have been collected by China's top museums and renowned collectors worldwide.

== Career ==
Xu Li was born in 1961 in Fujian, China. He graduated in 1985 from the Fine Arts Department of Fujian Normal University and completed his postgraduate studies in 1988 at Southwest Normal University.

He started his teaching career in 1985. From 1985 to 1995, he taught at the Art College of Jimei University and joined the China Artists Association in 1990. From 1990 to 1995, he served as the deputy dean and then dean of the Fine Arts Department at the Art College of Jimei University, as well as a professor at Xiamen University.

Since 1993, he has served as the leader of several Chinese art groups. Between 1993 and 2010, he held leadership positions at the artists associations and federations of literary and art circles of Xiamen city and Fujian province. From 2010 to 2023, he held leadership roles in the China Federation of Literary and Art Circles and the China Artists Association, and also served as the chairman of the National Major Artistic Creation Committee and the honorary president of the Beijing Contemporary Chinese Freehand Oil Painting Research Institute.

== Selected exhibitions ==
- In 1989, his oil painting "Forever" won the Bronze Prize at the Seventh National Art Exhibition held every five years, and was collected by the National Art Museum of China.
- In 2009, "Eternal Splendor" was displayed at and collected by Zhongnanhai, the Headquarters of the CPC Central Committee and the State Council.
- In 2014, he led the Chinese Artists Delegation to the US and held the "35th Anniversary of Sino-US Diplomatic Relations: Exhibition of Famous Chinese Painters' Works" with former US President Jimmy Carter.
- In 2015, he led the Chinese Artists Delegation to the Twelfth National Art Exhibition Italian Tour at the Medici Palace in Florence, Italy.
- In 2017, he led a delegation to Düsseldorf, Germany, and held the "Sino-German Artists Exhibition," where his works "Walking Scenery," "Great Beauty of the Tianshan Mountains," and "Full Load Returning" were collected by the Chinese Consulate General in Düsseldorf.
- In 2017, his works was displayed at "Imagery and Expression: A Study Exhibition of Modern Art Dialogue between East and West" featuring works by Pablo Picasso, Wu Guanzhong, Dalí, Tommaso, Joan Miró, and Xu Li in Beijing.
- In 2018, the United Nations World Intangible Cultural Heritage Protection Foundation issued four commemorative stamps featuring Xu Li's works globally, in collaboration with USA, France, Belgium, and the Netherlands.
- In 2018, "A Broad View of Sky and Sea" was collected by the National Art Museum of China and toured overseas.
- In 2019, his oil painting "Dialogue" was collected by the Leonardo da Vinci Ideal Museum in Italy.
- In 2019, his oil paintings "Clear Waters and Idyllic Home," "Homeland," and "Autumn Colors in the Setting Sun" were featured in the "Chinese Freehand: Art from the China Art Museum" exhibition held at the National Gallery of Lithuania, co-organized by the National Art Museum of China and the Lithuanian National Museum of Art.
- In 2023, "Ode to Rivers and Mountains: Xu Li's Freehand Oil Painting Exhibition" was held at the National Centre for the Performing Arts under the auspices of the China Artists Association.
- In 2023, "Shining Fragrant River: 2023 Xu Li's "'Hong Kong' Art Exhibition" was held at the Hong Kong City Hall.

== Selected publications ==
- 2020, "徐里作品集" ("Xu Li Collection", in Chinese, author)
- 2014, "吉祥雪域——徐里油画作品集" ("Auspicious Snowland - Xu Li Oil Painting Collection", in Chinese, author)
- 1995, "徐里油画选" ("Xu Li Oil Painting Collection", in Chinese, author)
