= Yan Xing (artist) =

Chinese artist and photographer (born 1986)

- Born: 1986 (age 39–40); Chongqing, China
- Education: Sichuan Fine Arts Institute
- Known for: Video art, Performance Art, Installation art, Conceptual art
- Website: www.yanxing.com

Yan Xing
- Chinese: 鄢醒
Transcriptions
Standard Mandarin
- Hanyu Pinyin: Yān Xǐng
- Wade–Giles: Yan^{1} Xing^{3}

Yan Xing (Chinese characters: 鄢醒, born 1986) is an artist known for performance, installation, video and photography. He grew up in Chongqing and currently lives and works in Beijing and Los Angeles.

== Early life and education ==
Yan Xing was born in Chongqing in 1986. He studied at the Oil Painting Department of Sichuan Fine Arts Institute from 2005 to 2009. After receiving his B.A., he moved to Beijing.

== Artistic career ==
Yan Xing is known for his interdisciplinary projects which have built a complex, compelling body of work that reflects critically on how history is manufactured today. He interrogates literature, history, and history of art. His work explores themes of negativity, resistance and order and the complexity of their connectivity. Yan Xing's works involve an extremely broad range of media, including performance, video, photography, installation, and painting, among others.

Yan Xing's career in art began with Daddy Project (2011), it was an hour-long performance he gave an account of his absent "father". The work was first performed in a group exhibition curated by Carol Yinghua Lu, art critic Holland Cotter wrote in the New York Times: "First-person public exposure of a personal life, particularly related to family, is relatively rare in China, and Mr. Yan has become a controversial star." The first institutional solo exhibition of his works was held in 2012 at Chinese Arts Centre, Manchester, UK; On 2016, his first solo exhibition in America opened at Eli and Edythe Broad Art Museum at Michigan State University in East Lansing, Michigan. From June 2 through August 27, 2017, the Kunsthalle Basel presented Yan Xing: Dangerous Afternoon, curated by Elena Filipovic, this was the artist's first institutional solo exhibition in Switzerland.

Yan Xing has exhibited and performed extensively, at institutions such as the Stedelijk Museum Amsterdam; Contemporary Arts Museum Houston; Ullens Center for Contemporary Art (UCCA), Beijing; OCT Contemporary Art Terminal (OCAT), Shenzhen and the Power Station of Art, Shanghai. He has also been featured at 7th Shenzhen Sculpture Biennale (2012); 3rd Moscow International Biennale for Young Art (2012) and 3rd Ural Industrial Biennial of Contemporary Art (2015).

Yan Xing is both the initiator and a participant of artists' collective COMPANY. His works have been public collections include: Rubell Family Collection, Miami; M+ Museum for Visual Culture, Hong Kong; Kadist Art Foundation, Paris; He Xiangning Art Museum, Shenzhen. Yan Xing has also curated exhibitions such as: Dream Plant, Sichuan Fine Arts Institute, Chongqing; Mummery, Art Channel, Beijing; and the Fact Study Institute, Yangtze River Space, Wuhan.

== Exhibitions ==
=== Selected solo exhibitions ===
- 2017
  - Dangerous Afternoon, Kunsthalle Basel, Basel, Switzerland
- 2016
  - Yan Xing, Eli and Edythe Broad Art Museum, Michigan State University, East Lansing, Michigan, US
- 2015
  - Thief, Galerie Urs Meile, Beijing, China
- 2013
  - Recent Works, Galerie Urs Meile, Beijing, China
- 2012
  - Yan Xing, Chinese Arts Centre, Manchester, UK
- 2011
  - Realism, Galerie Urs Meile, Beijing, China

=== Selected group exhibitions ===
- 2017
  - Spectrosynthesis, Museum of Contemporary Art Taipei, Taipei, Taiwan
- 2016
  - Sui Generis, Tenuta Dello Scompiglio, Capannori, Italy
  - De leur temps 5: Le temps de L’audace et de l’engagement, Institut d’Art Contemporain, Villeurbanne, France
  - We Chat: A Dialogue in Contemporary Chinese Art, Ezra and Cecile Zilkha Gallery, Center for the Arts, Wesleyan University, Middletown, Connecticut, US
- 2015
  - Teetering at the Edge of the World, Espacio de Arte Contemporáneo, Montevideo, Uruguay
  - Chercher le garçon, Musée d’Art Contemporain du Val-de-Marne, Vitry-sur-Seine, France
  - Traveling Alone, Tromsø Kunstforening, Tromsø, Norway
- 2014
  - My Generation: Young Chinese Artists, Tampa Museum of Art, Tampa, Florida, US. Travelled to Oklahoma City Museum of Art, Oklahoma City, Oklahoma, US, 2014; Orange County Museum of Art, Newport Beach, California, US, 2015
  - The 8 of Paths, Uferhallen, Berlin, Germany
- 2013
  - 28 Chinese, Rubell Family Collection, Miami, Florida, US. Travelled to Asian Art Museum, San Francisco, California, US, 2015; San Antonio Museum of Art, San Antonio, Texas, US, 2015
  - Unlimited, Art Basel, Messe Basel, Messeplatz, Basel, Switzerland
  - Future Generation Art Prize, Collateral Event of the 55th Venice Biennale, Palazzo Contarini Polignac, Venice, Italy
  - China China, Pinchuk Art Centre, Kiev, Ukraine
  - ON | OFF: China’s Young Artists in Concept and Practice, Ullens Center for Contemporary Art, Beijing, China
- 2012
  - Unfinished Country: New Video from China, Contemporary Arts Museum Houston, Houston, Texas, US
  - Becoming Peninsula I: Symptoms, Iberia Center for Contemporary Art, Beijing, China

== Awards ==
As a young artist, Yan Xing made an impressive result during recent years. He has received several notable awards, in 2012 he won the Best Young Artist Award by Chinese Contemporary Art Award (CCAA). The same year, he was a finalist in the Future Generation Art Prize by Victor Pinchuk Foundation and Focus on Talents Project from Today Art Museum.
