= Li Xiang (artist) =

Chinese watercolor artist born 1952

Li Xiang (Chinese: 李湘; pinyin: Lǐ Xiāng; born 1952) is a Chinese watercolor artist.

== Biography ==
Li was born in Beijing, China in 1952. She was a reproduction and restoration artist of ancient Chinese paintings at the Forbidden City of Beijing, China.

Li was first recognized in 1985 for creating the first complete collection, featuring 413 scenes from the Chinese classic novel, Dream of the Red Chamber. This collection was featured at Daguanyuan, studied and praised by Redology experts including Zhou Ruchang, and the brother of the Last Emperor, Pujie.

== Personal life ==
Li was married to calligrapher Shanmao Wu (1947-2009). They have a daughter, named Fei Wu. Li spends her time in Beijing, China and Boston, Massachusetts.

== Works ==
The Dream of the Red Chamber collection created by Li is part of a permanent collection in Qingdao, China.

The Dream of the Red Chamber collection was featured in the official magazine of the Dream of the Red Chamber in July 1985.

Li began working on her new art collection, Chinese Empresses, in 2014.

Li is a featured artist under Holbein Artist Materials.
