= Zhou Sicong =

Chinese artist (1939–1996)

- 周思聪
- Born: November 21, 1939; Ninghe
- Died: January 21, 1996; Beijing
- Occupation: Painter

Zhou Sicong (Chinese: 周思聪; November 21, 1939 – January 21, 1996) was one of the most prominent and influential Chinese painters of the late-20th century.

Zhou Sicong was born on November 21, 1939, in Ninghe District. She studied at the Central Academy of Fine Arts from 1958 to 1963, studying guohua (traditional Chinese ink and brush painting) under Li Keran, Li Kuchan, Ye Qianyu, Liu Lingcang, and Jiang Zhaohe.

Initially she worked with the predominant style of socialist realism, with its smooth, brightly colored celebrations of people and communist triumphs, but began to push against it. Her famous 1978 painting Zhou Enlai and the People, depicts Zhou Enlai's visit to Xingtai following the devastating 1966 Xingtai earthquakes. While the figures are still depicted with strict realism, the tone is somber with blacks and greys. She had yet to veer too far from socialist realism for fear of drawing political criticism.

Her series of six paintings, The Miners (1980–1983), depicts suffering coal miners during the Japanese occupation of Manchuria. She further broke with socialist realism, depicting exaggerated figures influenced by Käthe Kollwitz and German expressionism. She later said "It was necessary to change my style—to distort and exaggerate the figures of the miners. Without the distortion, I could not express the feeling of oppression in the painting." With the end of the Cultural Revolution, artists were freer to experiment, but the change in her style still brought criticism. Much of her work in the 1980s consists of sensitive depictions of everyday people and situations, such as the Yi Women series (1980–1982) of the Yi people of Liangshan, with its women in brightly colored national costumes carrying heavy loads.

In the late 1980s, arthritis prompted Zhou Sicong to focus on lotuses. Her flower paintings blend traditional guohua styles with modern abstraction.

Zhou Sicong died on 21 January 1996 in Beijing due to complications from pancreatitis.

== Personal life ==
Zhou Sicong married the painter Lu Chen.
