= Chongqing Art Museum =

Art museum in Chongqing, China

- 重庆美术馆
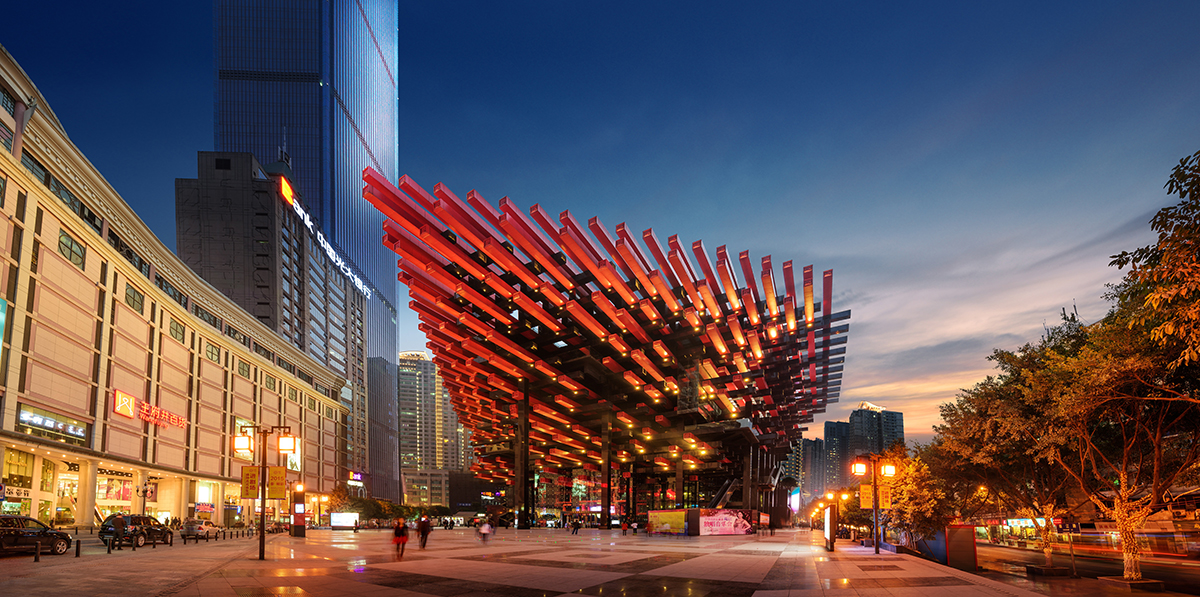
- Established: 2013
- Location: 1 Linjiang Road, Liberation Monument Shangquan, Yuzhong District, Chongqing, China
- Coordinates: 29.5601517°N 106.5771086°E
- Architects: China Architecture Design & Research Group
- Public transit access: Linjiangmen station ( Line 2)
- Website: chongqing-artmuseum.com

Chongqing Art Museum (Chinese: 重庆美术馆) (also known as Chongqing Art Gallery or Chongqing Guotai Arts Center) is an art museum in Yuzhong District of Chongqing. Its main focus is on traditional Chinese painting, printmaking, and small sculptures.

== Architecture ==
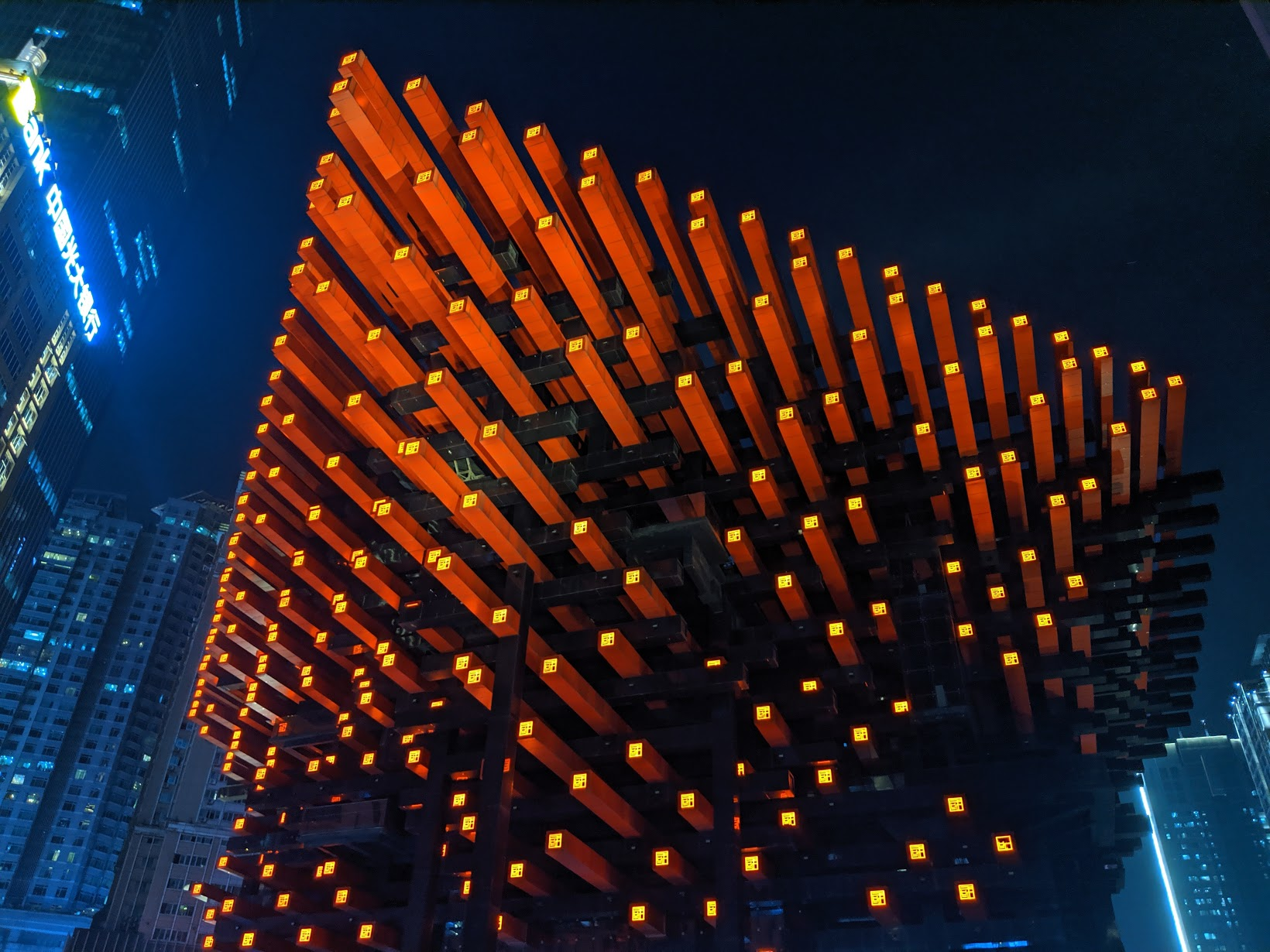
The Museum at Night

The building is well known for its striking architecture. Its outer structure consists of an interwoven pattern of beams. Red beams run north–south and black beams run east–west. The design is said to be inspired by chopsticks and the traditional Chinese meal of hot pot. The design has also been compared to the white fig tree, which is common in Chongqing.
