= Béatrice Cussol =

French artist and writer

Béatrice Cussol (born 1970) is a French artist and writer.

She was born in Toulouse and received a Diplôme national supérieur d'expression plastique from the Ecole Pilote Internationale d'Arte et de Recherche. She lives in Paris and teaches at the École supérieure d'art et design Le Havre-Rouen.

Cussol produces watercolors and drawings, as well as murals. She has had solo shows at the Centre d'Art Neuchâtel and at galleries in Vence, Nice, Paris and Marseille, and has participated in group exhibitions at the Yerba Buena Center for the Arts, at the Musée des Beaux-Arts de Tourcoing, at the Musée d'art contemporain de Lyon, at the BAWAG Foundation in Vienna, at La Criée in Rennes and at the Venice Biennale in 2003.

Her work is included in the collections of Fonds national d'art contemporain, the Musée d'art moderne et d'art contemporain in Nice, the Musée d'art moderne et montemporain in Geneva and the Fonds régional d'art contemporain of Provence-Alpes-Côte d'Azur.

== Selected writings ==
- Merci, novel (éd. Balland, coll. Le Rayon, 2000)
- Pompon, novel (éd. Balland, coll. Le Rayon, 2001)
- Diane ? (éd. Léo Scheer, 2003)
- Sinon, novel (éd. Léo Scheer, 2007)
- Les Souffleuses, novel (éd. Léo Scheer, 2009)

== Exhibitions ==
- 1994 : Béatrice Cussol, Villa Arson, Nice
- 1999 : Dessins 1994–1999, Mamco, Genève
- 2000 : Goldcream, Galerie Rachlin-Lemarié, Paris
- 2000 : Trois millions de Joconde, Art Concept, Paris
- 2008 : Duo, avec Dominique De Beir, Galerie Éric Mircher, Paris.
- 2008 : Béatrice Cussol et Georgia Nelson, Galerie RDV, Nantes
- 2009 : Aux petites filles modèles, collectif, Centre d'art Le LAIT
- 2010 : Collection d'été, collectif, Galerie Porte Avion, Marseille
- 2012 : Le nom d'une île, Maison des arts, Malakoff
- 2012 : Elga Wilmer Gallery, New York
- 2013 : Spritmuseum, Stockholm
