= Wu Weishan =

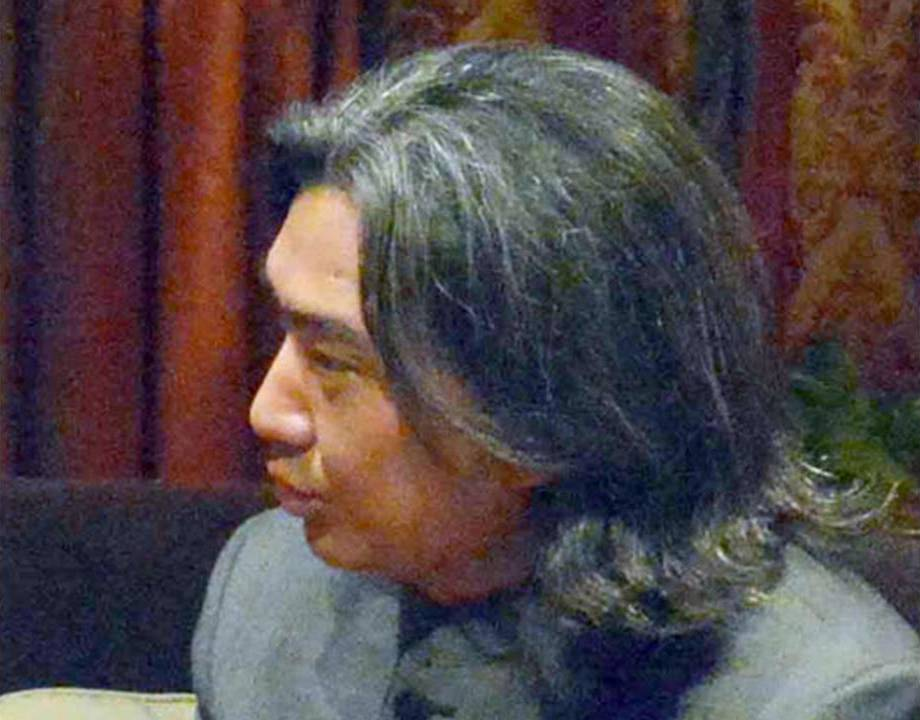
- Born: January 1962 (age 63–64); Dongtai, Jiangsu, China
- Known for: Sculpture

Wu Weishan (simplified Chinese: 吴为山; traditional Chinese: 吳為山; pinyin: Wú Wèishān; born: January 1962) is Curator of the National Art Museum of China, Vice-Chairman of the China Artists Association, President of the Chinese Academy of Sculpture and Director of the Academy of Fine Arts at Nanjing University. He has been actively promoting Chinese art on the world stage and has made great contribution to the international cultural exchange of China. He was awarded the First Award for Person of the Year in Art of P.R.C. in 2014 by the People's Republic of China. He was granted the title of "Artists with High Moral Virtue and Artistic Achievements of China" in 2015 and "Goodwill Ambassador for China Voices" by the State Council Information Office, P.R.C. in 2016.

== Biography ==
Wu Weishan was born in Dongtai, Jiangsu, China in January 1962. His father Wu Yaoxian (吴耀先) was a teacher, good at art and literature.

When Wu was 16, he started to study Chinese folk clay sculpture for three years in Wuxi, China's famous cradle of clay figures.

In 1987, he graduated from the Art Faculty of Nanjing Normal University.

He pursued his postgraduate studies at Peking University, and then at the Sam Fox School of Design & Visual Arts at Washington University in St. Louis.

Wu Weishan holds several positions including Curator of the National Art Museum of China, Vice-Chairman of the China Artists Association, the president of the China Academy of Sculpture and a professorship at Nanjing University, an honorary doctor of philosophy at Inje University, South Korea.

He is a member of the Royal British Society of Sculptors, the Society of Portrait Sculptors, UK and the Steering Committee of China City Sculpture. He is also a standing member of the China Sculpture Institute, professor of cultural lectures at Hong Kong University of Science and Technology.

He became the "Y.K. Pao Distinguished Visiting Artist" of Hong Kong University of Science and Technology, and also "'Gong Xueyin' Outstanding Scholar" of the Chinese University of Hong Kong. He was selected as Nanjing's first Top 10 Cultural Notables in 2006.

In 2016, he was conferred the Honorary Doctor by Herzen University and Honorary Professor by Imperial Academy of Arts.

In addition, he was awarded the "Ukraine Development Medal" by the Ministry of Culture of Ukraine, as well as the Honorary Medal of Ukraine President Foundation.

== Art ==
Wu Weishan has long been tapping into and drawing on the rich traditional Chinese culture and is committed to expressing the spirit of Chinese culture through his sculptures. With such belief, he created a large number of influential works which were then exhibited worldwide and collected by many key museums. One of his sculpture collections, consisting of a host of historical figures of China, is hailed as "Image Maker of the Time" by the respected scholar Ji Xianlin and is remarked as "representing the spirit of a new China" by international critics.

There is a sculpture garden named after him in South Korea and "Hall of Sculptures of Wu Weishan" established in Nanjing Museum. Many of his works, including "Conversation between Qin Baishi and Leonado Da Vinci" and "Confucius", have been permanently collected by National Museum of Rome, Fitzwilliam Museum of Cambridge and other world's most renowned museums, while his most representative sculptures, "Confucius" and "Asking Way", can be found in various countries. UN Secretary-General Ban KiMoon commended Professor Wu for his sculptures, saying that they reflect not only the soul of a country but also that of all mankind. Wu Weishan has engaged in sculpture creation for more than twenty years, and has created more than 500 sculptures including historical and cultural notables and ordinary people, home and abroad. In his sculptures, he advocates the integration of the expressive spirit of traditional Chinese art; in theories of fine arts, he is the first to put up the "On Expressive Sculpture" and "Theory of Eight Major Styles of Traditional Chinese Sculpture", blazing a new trail of expressive sculpture in China. His sculpture works for some ordinary people in our daily life express the sincere and honest vitalities, penetrating into a great many people's heart. These elegant sentiments originate from his adeptly life-catching eyes and poetic soul. His works are full of Chinese wisdom and traits. The "Sleeping Child" was selected for the 50th Anniversary Exhibition of the Society of Portrait Sculptors, UK, and won the Pangolin Award. Mr. Anthony Stones, Chairman of the British Royal Portrait Sculpture Association, commended Wu Weishan as being "an outstanding Chinese sculptor who has established an indigenous stylistic approach to portrait and figurative sculpture.

== Research results ==
Professor Wu composed a history of Chinese culture by a series of sculptures for cultural celebrities: Lao Tzu, Confucius, Lu Xun and Feng Youlan. These sculptures unambiguously express his anticipation for the strength of character and soul that are needed in this era. He was invited to build the sculptures for the Netherlands Beatrix of the Netherlands|Queen Beatrix Wilhelmina Armgard and also Philippine Gloria Macapagal-Arroyo|President Arroyo. Netherlands Queen praised the respected cultural aged men sculptured by him as "walking out from the 5000-year culture".

Wu Weishan is the first person who puts forward the "Theory of Impressionistic Sculpture" and "Eight Styles of Chinese Sculpture" and published several treatises and books to elaborate his theory. This theory summarizes the great tradition of Chinese sculpture and plays a major guiding role in boosting sculptural creation in today's China.

== Reports on television ==
His achievements have been reported in two episodes of "Extraordinary People of the East" by China Central Television.

== Collections and exhibitions ==
His works are collected by the National Art Museum of China, Rijksmuseum in the Netherlands, Honolulu Museum of Art, and the Fourth University of Paris etc. In Nanjing Museum, there is a permanent "Gallery of Wu Weishan's sculptures of Cultural Notables", and also there is a "Sculpture Studio of Professor Wu Weishan" at Macao Polytechnic Institute.

=== Personal sculpture and painting exhibitions ===
- 1996, The European Ceramic Work Centre, Netherlands (sponsored by Netherlands National Art Foundation)
- 1998, Gallery on the Rim, USA, "Wu weishan sculpture exhibition"
- 1999, Hong Kong Arts Centre, "Wu weishan sculpture and painting exhibition"
- 1999, UNESCO Centre of Macau, "Wu weishan sculpture and painting exhibition"
- 2000, Hong Kong University of Science and Technology, "Wu weishan sculpture and painting exhibition"
- 2002, Chinese University of Hong Kong, "Wu weishan sculpture and painting exhibition"
- 2005, Yufuku Gallery in Tokyo, Japan, "Wu weishan sculpture and painting exhibition"
- 2005, Qingdao city Shandong province, "Wu weishan sculpture exhibition"
- 2006, National Art Museum of China, "Casting the Soul with the Literary Heart----Exhibition of Wu Weishan's Sculptural Works"
- 2006, Changchun World Sculpture Park, "Casting the Soul with the Literary Heart----Exhibition of Wu Weishan's Sculptural Works"
- 2006, Jiangsu Provincial Art Museum, "Casting the Soul with the Literary Heart----Exhibition of Wu Weishan's Sculptural Works"

=== Major Participation in Exhibition ===
- "The First Beijing International Art Biennial Exhibition", 2003, Beijing
- "The Second Beijing International Art Biennial Exhibition", 2005, Beijing
- "The 10th National Exhibition of Art", 2005, Beijing
- "Centenary Exhibition of Sculpture", 2005, Shanghai
- "Exhibition of Fine Arts Literature", 2005, Beijing
- "The 50th Anniversary Exhibition of the Society of Portrait Sculptors, UK", 2003, London
- "The Exhibition of the Society of Portrait Sculptors, UK", 2004, London

== Leading Awards ==
- In 2003, he won the Pangolin Award of the Royal British Society of Sculptors
- In 2004, he won the Recognition Award of the Third Exhibition of City Sculpture in China
- In 2008, he won the Recognition Award of City Sculpture in China,
- In 2009, he won the Chinese Urban Sculpture Achievement Award
- In 2011, he won the First China Arts Award in 2011
- In 2012, won the International Gold Medal of Arts of Le Salon des Beaux Arts
- In 2014, the First Award for Person of the Year in Art of the P.R.C. by RRC
- In 2015, he was granted the title of "Artists with High Moral Virtue and Artistic Achievements of China" and "Goodwill Ambassador for China Voices" by the State Council Information Office, P.R.C. in 2016.
- In 2016, he was awarded the Gold Medal, the highest honor by the Russian Academy of Arts.

== Monograph ==
- Wu Weishan. "The Psychology of Visual Arts" (260000 words), Nanjing Normal University Press, 1999
- Wu Weishan. "Thus Saith the Sculpture" (200000 words), China Social Sciences Press, 2002
- Wu Weishan. "Woodcarving of Western Han Dynasty", The People's Fine Arts Publishing House, Tianjing, 2003
- Wu Weishan. "Spirit of Sculptors", (Korea Edition), 2007
- Wu Weishan. "The Poetry of Sculpture", (English Edition), World Scientific Publishing, Singapore, 2007
- Wu Weishan. "The Poetry of Sculpture", (Chinese Edition), Nanjing University Press, 2007

== Papers ==
- Wu Weishan, "Art life", May 2001
- Wu Weishan, "vagueness and vividness—from molding spirits of characters", Literature and Art Studies, February 2002
- Wu Weishan, "on the expressional sculptures", Art research, January 2004
- Wu Weishan, "The stylistic quality of Chinese Sculpture in my eye", Literature and Art Studies, June 2005
- Wu Weishan, "Amazing similarity: a talk on sculpture", Sculpture, May 2007
- Wu Weishan, "Ramble about sculpture II—thinking in comparing", "Sculpture", June 2007
- Wu Weishan, "the 3rd time in talk about sculpture: part three—be lifelike by means of vagueness", Sculpture, February 2008
- Wu Weishan, "the power of human nature—the thought brought from Effigy of Einstein's sculpture", Sculpture, March 2008
- Wu Weishan, "Sculpture Aspiration", "Sculpture", June 2008
- Wu Weishan, "The return of the ghosts: the group sculpture of Nanjing Slaughter", "Literature and Art Studies", April 2008
- Wu Weishan, "The Heroic Symphonies-To Observe the Beethoven Statue Series of Bourdelle", "Sculpture", January 2009
- Wu Weishan, "My View on Mr. Wanq Chaowen's Aesthetic View-point of Sculpture-Random Thoughts of Reading" "Sculpt Sculpture" (Part One), Sculpture February 2009
- Wu Weishan, "My View on Mr. Wanq Chaowen's Aesthetic View-point of Sculpture-Random Thoughts of Reading" "Sculpt Sculpture" (Part two), Sculpture March 2009
- Wu Weishan, "The Value of the Yellow River Iron Ox", Sculpture April 2009
- Wu Weishan, "On the Religious and Cultural Characteristics of Cambodian Angkor Wat Art", Yuejiang Academic Journal March 2009

== Picture albums ==
- "Wu Weishan's Sculptures", The People's Fine Arts Publishing House, Beijing, 1999
- "Wu Weishan's Sculptures and Paintings", 1999
- "The Sketch of Spirit", The People's Fine Arts Publishing House, Tianjing, 2002
- "Wu Weishan's Sculptures and Paintings", Guwuxuan Publishing House, 2005
- "Wu Weishan's Expressive sculptures", Jiangsu Art Press, 2006
