= Wu Zuoren =

Chinese painter

Wu Zuoren 吴作人
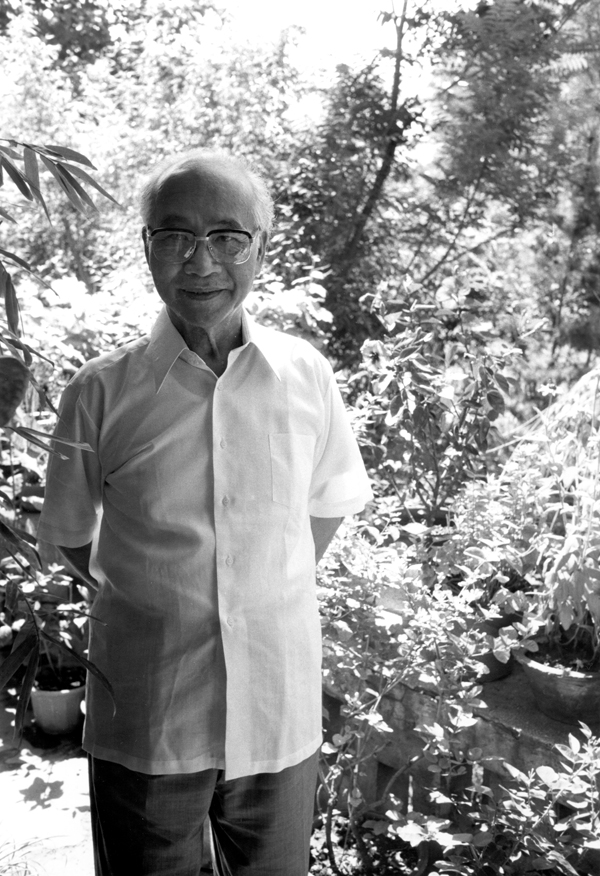
- Wu Zuoren in his garden Photo by Sally Larsen; Taken in 1988 at Beijing
- Born: 3 November 1908; Suzhou, Jiangsu, Qing dynasty
- Died: 9 April 1997 (aged 88); Beijing, China
- Education: Shanghai Art University; National Central University; Académie Royale des Beaux-Arts, Brussels
- Known for: Painting, Drawing, Calligraphy, Engraving

Wu Zuoren (Chinese: 吴作人; pinyin: Wú Zuòrén; Wade–Giles: Wu Tso-jen; 3 November 1908 – 9 April 1997) was a Chinese painter. A native of Jing County, Anhui, he was born in Suzhou, Jiangsu Province. He practiced both traditional Chinese ink painting and European oil painting.

== Chronology ==
- 1908: Wu Zuoren is born in Suzhou, Jiangsu, Qing dynasty.
- 1927: Wu Zuoren studies in the department of fine arts at Shanghai Art University where his ability is recognized by Xu Beihong. Later, he transfers to the department of fine arts at Nanguo Academy of Arts.
- 1928: Wu Zuoren follows Xu Beihong to study at the National Central University (renamed Nanjing University in 1949).
- 1930 - 1935: Wu Zuoren travels abroad to study in Europe. He returns to China in 1935.
- 1939: Wu Zuoren's first wife, Lina, a Belgian national, dies at an early age while they are at Nanjing University, due to postpartum depression complicated by the bombardment of Chongqing by Japanese war planes.
- 1949: With the establishment of the People's Republic of China, Wu Zuoren joins the China Artists Association.
- 1949-1953: Wu Zuoren becomes a professor and the first provost of China Central Academy of Fine Arts.
- 1953: Wu Zuoren is elected vice president of the China Artists Association.
- 1954: Wu Zuoren becomes a permanent member of the National People's Congress.
- 1958: Wu Zuoren becomes the principal of the China Central Academy of Fine Arts.

Wu Zuoren's Giant Panda postage stamps, first issue, 1963

- 1963: Wu Zuoren sets out to change the face of China when presented with the opportunity to design a three postage stamps for the People's Republic of China. Known for his ink paintings of yaks and camels in western China Wu Zuoren's Giant Panda stamps first issued in 1963 establish the giant panda as the emblem of the new China. A second series of six Giant Panda stamps by Wu Zouren was issued in 1973, and a more elaborate Giant Panda edition based on his ink paintings produced in 1985.

For the remainder of his life, Wu Zuoren remains a prominent member of the central committee of the China Democratic League, Chairman of the Chinese Artists Association, and a member of the standing committee of the National People's Congress. Wu Zuoren's second wife, Xiao Shufang, was an artist known for her flower paintings. Wu Zuoren founded and endowed the "Wu Zuoren International Foundation of Fine Arts".

- 1997: Wu Zuoren died in 1997 in Beijing.
