= Jiang Feng (artist) =

Chinese artist

Jiang Feng (Chinese: 江丰; 1910–1983) was a Chinese artist known for incorporating politics into his artwork, and using woodcut as his form of media. He was a member of the Communist Party.

== Early life ==
Jiang Feng was born in Shanghai. His original name was Zhou Xi (周熙). Jiang grew up in a working class family. As a teenager, he became involved in left-wing politics, mainly because he worked as a bookkeeper for a railroad company and participated in labor strike activities.

At the age of nineteen, Jiang began taking classes at the White Swan Western Painting Club in Shanghai.

== Left-Wing Activity ==
In 1931, Jiang joined a group of protesting students and launched the Shanghai Eighteen Art Society Research Center. The group got its name from the year it began forming, 1929- the 18th year of the republic. The group published and spread anti-imperialist propaganda among Chinese workers.

He participated in founding Lu Xun's Creative Print Movement. Lu supplied the Eighteen Art Society with funds, woodcuts, and books. He put Jiang and the members of the "Eighteen Art Society in charge of selecting students for the workshop on woodcut technique in 1931 that Lu Xun organized in Shanghai."

In 1932, Jiang officially became a part of the Communist Party. Soon after he was elected executive of the League of Left-Wing Artists.

On numerous occasions, Jiang Feng was arrested. Shortly after Jiang joined the Communist Party, he was arrested along with eleven other members of the Eighteen Art Society by the Nationalist Government. He spent two years in prison. During this time he led hunger strikes and organized a school. In 1933, two months after his release, Jiang was rearrested, and spent another two years in jail. In the wake of Mao Zedong's Rectification Campaign in 1942 Jiang was arrested again for unknown reasons.

After his second release from prison, he returned to Shanghai in 1935. There, he continued his political activity. Jiang worked for a publication titled Iron Horse Press. He produced several woodcuts inspired by Soviet Constructivism for them.

When the Japanese attacked Shanghai in 1937, Jiang fled to the Chinese Workers' and Peasants' Red Army in Yan'an.

== Career ==
In 1939, Jiang Feng was an instructor at Lu Xun Academy of Literature and Art in Yan'an. He was made director of the art department the following year. In this particular position, he was in charge of the art factory responsible for producing nianhua prints for Red Army propaganda.

"Between 1945 and 1949, Jiang dedicated his work to the war of liberation against the nationalists."

Jiang Feng held many different positions at various institutes.

In 1946 he was the Head of the Art Department at Huabei United Revolutionary University. In 1949 he was the Vice-Chairman of Chinese Artists' Association under Maoist regime. He also held the titles of Deputy Director, then Director of Chinese Artists' Association. From 1949 through 1957 Feng was the leading figure in Mao's project of cultural reform in the art world.

Jiang was the Vice President of Zhejiang Academy of Fine Arts in Hangzhou. He was also the President of the prestigious Central Academy of Fine Arts in Beijing.

In July 1949, Jiang was elected to the National Committee of All-China Literary and Arts Circles.

He was made an Honorary Chairman of Chinese Print Media Artists Association.

In 1956, Jiang had been critical of guohua ink painting, describing it as an irredeemably traditional form of art. In turn, ink painters criticized Jiang, contending that he was "trying to extinguish guohua". During the Anti-Rightist Campaign, these disputes resulted in Jiang being stripped of his titles and expelled from the Communist Party.

Jiang was politically rehabilitated after the Mao era. In 1979, after the Cultural Revolution ended, Jiang was honored with Presidency of the Chinese Artists' Association.

=== Teachings ===
While working at these academies, Jiang taught using two concepts of art: Yan'an conception of art education and the Russian system of art education. The Yan'an conception of art education required students to learn Marxist and Mao Zedong thought. Students also had to devote a significant amount of time to working with peasants, workers, and soldiers. The Russian system of art education emphasized drawing from life and from plaster casts of sculpture, and acquiring the skills needed to paint with oils and watercolors.

Because Jiang was dedicated to the medium of printmaking, this was eventually granted independent department status within schools.

== Artwork ==
Much of Jiang Feng's artwork incorporated styles from other countries. In 1931 he produced a woodcut titled, "Kill the Resisters." It is in the stark style of German Expressionism. The painting depicts a group of flag-warning demonstrators fleeing from the gunfire of armed Nationalist troops.

In 1942 Jiang created, "Studying is Good," which was a mix of nianhua prints and positive Communist content. It conveyed two children holding up a writing brush and abacus, while squash and grain are growing at their feet. The slogan above their heads reads, "Studying is good. After you study you can do accounts and write letters."

Jiang also published papers on art: "Art of Italian Renaissance," "Appreciation of Western Famous Paintings," and "Art of DaVinci."
