= Pan Gongkai =

Chinese painter

Pan Gongkai (Chinese: 潘公凯; born 1947) is a leading figure in the Chinese art world, celebrated for his contributions as an art historian, educator, calligrapher, painter and architect. He is currently a professor at Fudan University in Shanghai. He also holds the position of doctoral advisor at the Central Academy of Fine Arts (CAFA) and the Macau University of Science and Technology.

== Life ==
Pan is the son of the painter Pan Tianshou. He was born in Ninghai County, Ningbo, Zhejiang Province on January 24, 1947.

Pan studied at the Middle School Attached to the Zhejiang Academy of Art, then Zhejiang Academy of Art (now China Academy of Art).

From November 1979 to November 1984 Pan was a lecturer in the Department of Chinese Painting, China Academy of Art, before becoming the head of the department in 1987. In 1992 he was a visiting professor to the United States and received an honorary doctor degree of art there. From April 1996 to May 2001 he was the president of the China Academy of Art. Pan was also president of Central Academy of Fine Arts (CAFA).

== Honors ==
His international recognition includes honorary doctorates from the San Francisco Art Institute (1992), the University of Glasgow (2012), the Maryland Institute College of Art (2013), and Emily Carr University of Art + Design (2014).

Twice honoured as a National Expert with Special Contributions (1991, 1997), Pan was also awarded a Government Special Allowance in 1997. He led two of China’s most prestigious art academies as president, driving their rapid growth from 1996 to 2014, and served as vice-chairman of the China Artists Association from 2001 to 2013. His leadership extended to several national key projects, including the visual design for the 29th Summer Olympic Games (2008), the Beijing World Design Conference and inaugural Beijing Design Week (2009), the Shanghai World Expo (2010), and International Art Education Forum for Art and Design Academy Presidents (2011).

== Works ==
Pan's achievements span five key areas: art history and theory, art education, Chinese painting, contemporary art, and urban and architectural design. His seminal work, The Road of Modern Chinese Art (6 volumes, 2012), has been published in Korean (2019), Japanese (2020), and German (forthcoming), and received the First Prize in Philosophy and Social Sciences at the 7th "Outstanding Research Achievements in Chinese Universities" awards, China's highest national honour.

He was also general editor of 60 Years of Chinese Art, 1949-2009, (2009, People's Publishing House) and The Compendium of Modern Design. Further, he has systematically compiled and documented the traditional ink paintings and art theories of his father, master of Chinese painting Pan Tianshou (1897-1971), resulting in publications such as The Collected Paintings and Calligraphy of Pan Tianshou (1996), Pan Tianshou and the Art of Painting (2011), The Complete Works of Pan Tianshou (2015), and Chinese Brush-and-Ink (2017).

== Exhibitions ==
Pan has held solo exhibitions in major cities worldwide, including San Francisco (1993), Paris (1997), Berlin (2008), Beijing (2006), Taipei (2006), Shanghai (2006), Guangzhou (2007), Ningbo (2008), Prague (2009), Macau (2011), Tokyo (2011), London (2012), Ann Arbor (2014), Seattle (2014), New York (2014), Santiago (2015), Vancouver (2015), and Hong Kong (2019). His participation in international contemporary art exhibitions includes installations such as "Fusion" and ink paintings "Lotus in the Wind" and "Snow Melting in the Lotus," showcased at the Venice Biennale (2011, 2015).

== Architecture ==
In urban planning and architecture, Pan has completed or is working on over 20 projects, including the Ninghai Arts and Cultural Centre (2017), Ningbo University School of Arts (2018), Wenzhou Ouyao Museum (2020), and the Haining Qiantang Tidal Bore Museum (2022).
