= Luo Zhongli =

Chinese painter (born 1948)

- 罗中立
- Born: 1948 (age 77–78)
- Known for: Oil painting

Luo Zhongli (simplified Chinese: 罗中立; traditional Chinese: 羅中立; pinyin: Luó Zhōnglì; born in 1948) is a contemporary Chinese painter and educator. He has a deep affection for rural China and its residents, which have remained a major theme in his body of work. His painting "Father" is recognized as one of the most renowned works in contemporary Chinese art.

His art works have been notably active in the art market. By August 2011, over 700 pieces associated with the artist had been auctioned, with 581 of these works being successfully sold for a collective sum of RMB 422 million.

== Career ==
Luo Zhongli graduated from the Oil Painting Department of the Sichuan Fine Arts Institute, specializing in oil painting. In 1998, he became the President of the Sichuan Fine Arts Institute, a role he held until November 2015.

Under the advocacy of Luo Zhongli, the "Luo Zhongli Scholarship" was established and funded by Lin Mingzhe from 1992 to 1998 and was revived in 2005 with sponsorship from Mr. Qiu Haoran, continuing to this day. 267 young artists have received this scholarship in the past seventeen years.

In 2015, the Luo Zhongli Art Museum, also known as the Sichuan Fine Arts Institute Art Museum (Huxi Campus), opened in Chongqing. The museum features a collection encompassing various stages of Luo Zhongli's artistic career. Additionally, it displays a substantial number of works by artists who graduated from the Sichuan Fine Arts Institute, as well as works by recipients of the Luo Zhongli Scholarship.

== Selected exhibitions ==
- 1989 – Chicago, USA – Chicago Art Center, Luo Zhongli Solo Exhibition
- 2008 – New York, USA – Asia Society and Museum, Art and China's Revolution (Group)
- 2022 – Beijing, China – Tang Contemporary Art, Return to the Starting Point: Luo Zhongli Retrospective 1965-2022
