= China/Avant-Garde Exhibition =

Coordinates: 39.9253°N 116.4090°E

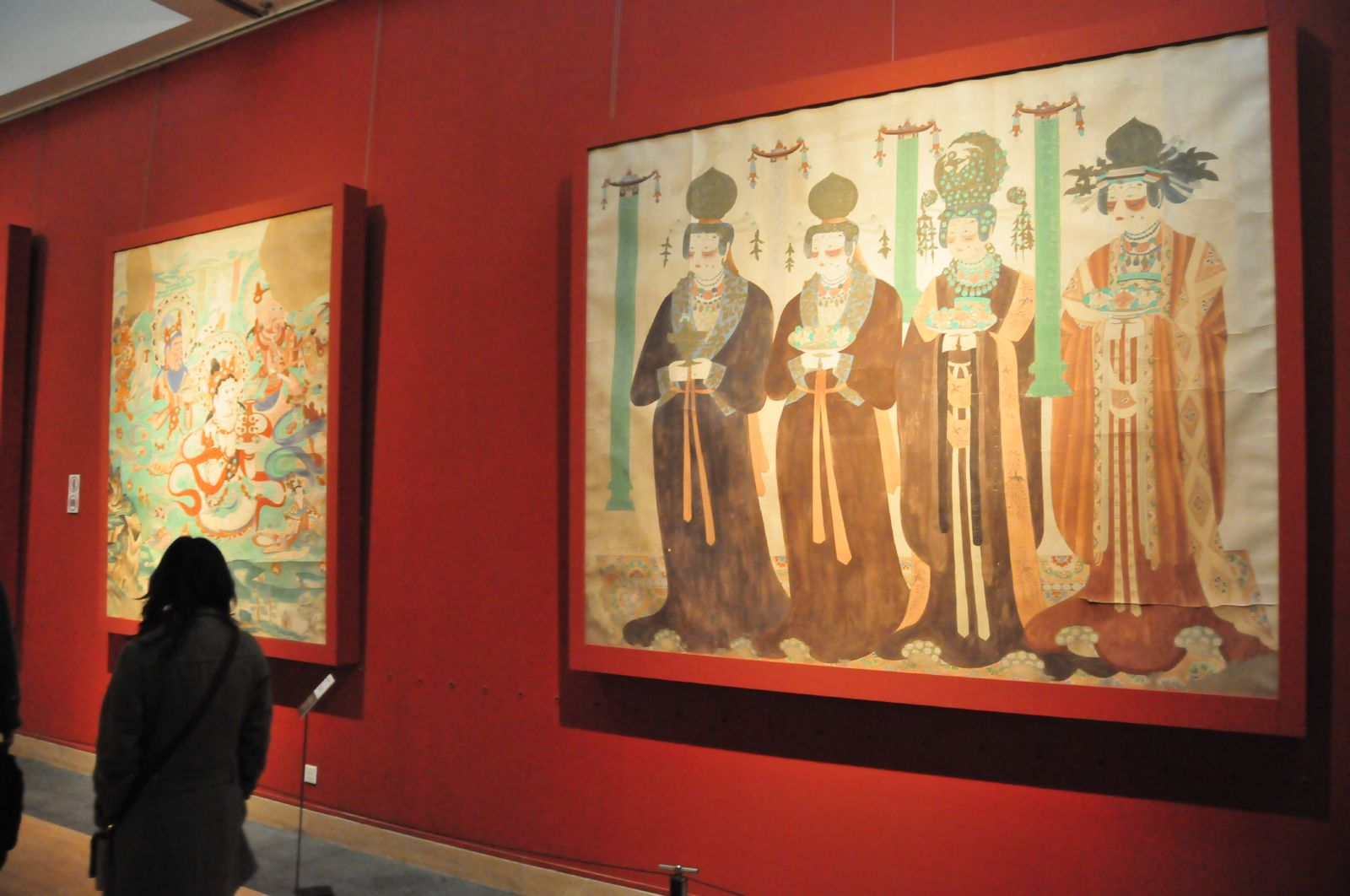
Beijing National Art Museum of China

China/Avant-Garde Exhibition is one of the most significant exhibitions in the history of Chinese contemporary art. Opening on February 5, 1989, at the National Art Museum of China (formerly the National Art Gallery), and featured over 186 artists and approximately 300 artworks from all over China. Widely regarded as a pivotal moment in the history of contemporary Chinese art, the exhibition provided a comprehensive view of the experimental works that emerged in mainland China after 1985.

Notable examples of these experimental artworks included Xiao Lu's impromptu performance where the artist used a loaded handgun to shoot her own piece called Dialogue and Wu Shanzhuan in his work called Big Business, sold frozen shrimp from a makeshift market stall. These works, among others, led to the temporary closing of the exhibition.

== Concept of the exhibition ==
The exhibition was curated by Li Xianting, Peng De and Gao Minglu.

With performance art and unprecedented installations, the environment was more chaotic than the museum's usual offerings. Artist Zhang Peili recalls: "More than your typical art show, it really looked more like a farmer's market....What mattered that day wasn't the art, or the show itself. Everybody knew that we were making history. We were totally investing in our roles as actors on a stage where anybody could suddenly become a star."

The exhibition was shut down only two hours after it opened, when artist Xiao Lu shot her own work, Dialogue, with a pellet gun. After the Tiananmen Square massacre occurred four months later, these shots were called "the first shots of Tiananmen" by the media.

Wang Guangyi's Mao Zedong: Red Grid No. 1 triptych obtained significant attention. Wang describes the grid as a reference to the method for transferring portraits of Mao to larger canvasses for display during the Cultural Revolution.

== After the exhibition ==
After the exhibition, with the assistance of art critic Gao Minglu, an individual businessman in Beijing—who had contributed part of the funding for the exhibition—purchased works from over a dozen artists, including Wang Guangyi, Zhang Xiaogang, Ye Yongqing, Ding Fang, Mao Xuhui and Zhang Peili, at a price of 10,000 renminbi (approximately $1,200) a piece. Song Wei, who later set up one of China's first private art galleries, has since disappeared and it is unclear whether the works he acquired survived.
