= Wu Shanzhuan =

Chinese-born artist (born 1960)

Wu Shanzhuan (born October 25, 1960) is an artist based in Hamburg.

== Biography ==
Wu was born in Zhoushan, Zhejiang Province. His art is Conceptual in nature, often dealing with issues surrounding language. His work includes painting, drawing, installation, photography and performance. Wu Shanzhuan graduated from the Zhejiang Academy of Fine Arts in Hangzhou (now the China Academy of Art) in 1986. He moved to Europe in the late 1980s, and obtained a master's degree from the College of Fine Arts at the University of Fine Arts of Hamburg (Hochschule für Bildende Künste, 1989). He lived in Germany and Iceland for over ten years, and returned to China in 2005.

As one of the leaders of the Chinese Conceptual Movement in the 1980s, Wu Shanzhuan was the first Chinese artist to assimilate textual pop references into his work. Wu's pivotal installation, Red Humour International (1986), laid the foundation for his "highly idiosyncratic and sophisticated approach to painting, which forgoes image in favour of political jingoism, religious scripture, and advertising slogans".

Known for his experimental works with language and the use of big character posters, Wu is a kind of precursor to the better known works of Gu Wenda and Xu Bing. Wu was part of the red humor group, who toyed with language and meaning. His works are filled with satire, language tricks, symbols and radical games. He has posed nude in his art works for a while with his wife, Inga Svala Thorsdottir. Inga was born in 1966 in Iceland, and graduated from the Painting Department of the Icelandic School of Arts and Crafts in 1991. In 1995, she graduated from the Hochschule für bildende Künste in Hamburg. She founded Thor's Daughter's Pulverization Service in 1993, and BORG in 1999. "His work is filled with absurd imagery and fantastical language."

== The Chinese Character and the Cultural Revolution ==
The Cultural Revolution caught public attention when the first Marxist-Leninist ‘big character’ poster was put up at Peking University in 1966. These ‘big character’ posters started appearing all over campus in the next few days. Although they were a common medium in the political battle of Mao Zedong’s time, they reached their peak during the Cultural Revolution. Campaigns were declared on these posters, along with criticisms of factions, and the denunciation of individuals. When this ‘mass voice’ became fully supported by Mao, a new visual landscape was created, with slogans, directives, criticisms and moral aphorisms flooding all surfaces.

A key visual aspect of the Cultural Revolution was Mao's portrait and the image of a worker/peasant/soldier. Mao accomplished mass coverage, and the Chinese text was used to carry the literary meaning to the people. The artistic value of calligraphy can sometimes overpower its content though, like in cursive styled texts or of the fragments of a masterpiece. Historian Wu Hung suggests, “all traditional calligraphers conducted this transformation in one way or another, but none of them tried to completely divorce form from content. A radical departure from this ancient tradition only occurred in contemporary Chinese art”. This change of the meaning of text occurred after the Cultural Revolution.

During the Cultural Revolution, identified as a “great revolution that touches people to their very souls”, writing was used to deliver visual violence as well as political messages. The language is the most deeply rooted element of the Chinese culture, and the revolution infringed on this for sure success. With the visual power of the Chinese character, it was inevitable that the avant-garde artists would revisit the potential of the written word in the late 1980s. As Wu Shanzhuan said, “The Chinese character is the most significant element, in terms of its ability to shape people’s thinking or to influence the national psychology”.

== School ==
Some of the other graduates of the Zhejiang Academy of Fine Art, who began to play a leading role in China in the mid-1980s, were Wang Guangyi, Shang Peili, Geng Jianyi, Huang Yongping, and Gu Wenda. Although they probably didn't learn too much from the teachers directly, due to the domination of a realist style in academies, they learned from young teachers and classmates outside of the classroom. Imported Euro-American books also inspired these artists in the early 1980s. The director of the academy bought all the publications from the “Exhibition of International Art Publications”, which opened in the National History Museum in Beijing in 1982, and these resources, published in various languages, greatly stimulated the ’85 Movement generation.

Another influential force came from the open educational environment adopted by the school. In 1985, students became allowed to create a single work in any freely chosen style, although they had to follow their instructor’s favored subject and technique. Though quite controversial, this resulted in experimental works that expressed many different individual conceptions and styles. Under this new policy, the students were also able to choose different conceptual and technical approaches that allowed the creation of multipart series. A sensation was caused in the Chinese art world when the experimental works of the class of 1985 were displayed at the graduation exhibition. These artists, born in the generation of the 1960s, who were trained after the Cultural Revolution, adopted the new avant-garde orientation.

Similar happenings were taking place in other academies in China, such as in Sichuan, Beijing, and Guangzhou. Works from various academies were brought together in May 1985 in the exhibition “Young Art of Progressive China”, held in the National Art Museum of China. Neorealism and Western surrealism were shown in the most remarkable of the works.

== Guannian Art ==
Two types of low-key avant-garde existed during the early 1990s: apartment art and maximalism. They involved a retreat from the public sphere, differing from political pop and cynical realism. Tracking back to the 1970s and 1980s, they only came to be known in the 1990s through neo-Chinese guannian (idea) art. “The neo-guannian art of Chinese avant-garde artists had been forced to abandon the avant-garde myth, the innocence, and even the naiveté that had been adopted by the ’85 Movement”. ‘Revolution in art’ was no longer their interest. Instead, change in the relationships between themselves and their environment became the focus. Wu Shanzhuan, and other guannian artists, like Xu Bing, fixated on the revolution in ideas itself to elaborate on their concept of an anti-art project. The works of these artists were expected to be understood by viewers, and to be objects of byproducts. 1980s art can be partially comprehended as part of a project of dematerializing art-making.

There is no Western historical relationship that goes along with this movement due to the integral nature of calligraphic history, along with the vital allegorical, metaphorical, and poetic combination of words and images in the history of Chinese art. Wu Shanzhuan, along with other Chinese artists such as Xu Bing and Gu Wenda, hold ideas where images and words are undertaken into one holistic concept. The anti-art development, therefore, is a response to the outside forces of the social and artistic environment. The project was initiated by Huang Yongping, and further developed by Wu Shanzhuan, Gu Wenda, Xu Bing, and others. All of these artists also embraced the traditional philosophy of Chan Buddhism, “which encourages an ironic sensibility and a refusal to privilege any one doctrine over another in the search for truth”.

Apartment art had moved on to a different approach on materialization, and that of communicated relations between artists and things, in which the subject matter was more valued than the concept/idea. Subjects being taken from daily life, the discovery of new ideas was secondary to the work being engaged. Artists were able to make art in a strictly controlled environment because originality to them didn't come from thinking, but from touching the materials. This kind of art was concentrated on the observable and palpable. The physical context of an object, its location and relocation, was also important to them.

== Red Humor installations ==
There are four parts to Wu's Red Humor installations in Zhejiang: Red Characters: Big-Character Posters, Red Seals, Windy Red Flags, and Big Business. He often used ready-made objects in his art. 70% Red, 25% Black, and 5% White serves as a preface for the Red Humor group. Cultural Revolution slogans mix freely with advertising pitches, and ancient poems on the walls of the installation Red Humor. On the floor are four large characters saying, “Nobody knows what it means.”

He created a "Big Business" performance that involved selling shrimp; he brought 300 kilograms of fresh shrimp from a fishing village in Zoushan, Zhejing province. After writing the price of the shrimp on a blackboard, he began selling them. Liu Kaiqu, one of the most influential sculptors in China, was the first buyer. This work demonstrated Wu's idea that modern art in society is just a big business. He explained his performance after the authorities shut him down saying, "The National Art Museum is not only a place to display artwork, but it also can be a black market. For the Chinese New Year, I have brought first-quality shrimp suitable for export from my home village in celebration of the holiday and to enrich people's spiritual and material life in our capital. The unit price: 9.5 yuan. Place of display: National Art Museum. Urgent for buying."

== Selected exhibitions ==
2003

A Strange Heaven: Contemporary Chinese Photography, Galerie Rudolfinum, Prague, Czech Republic

2002

Made By Chinese, Galerie Enrico Navarra, Paris

Chicago Art Fair, Chicago

2001

Today No Water, Ethan Cohen Fine Arts, New York

2000

Conceptualist Art: Points of Origin 1950s-1980s, Walker Art Center

1999

Thing’s Right(s), Cuxhavener Kunstverein, Germany

1998

Inside Out – New Chinese Art, New York, P.S 1 Contemporary Art Center, New York

Vege-Pleasure, Ingolfsstraeti 8 Gallery, The Reykjavik Art Festival 1998, Iceland

1996

Please Don’t Move, Bahnwärterhaus, Gallery der Stadt, Esslingen

1995

Xineses, Centre d’Art Santa Mònica, Barcelona

1994

Maos Ungezähmte Kinder, Römer Museum Hildesheim
