= Vancouver International Sculpture Biennale =

Canadian open-air museum

Vancouver International Sculpture Biennale (French:Biennale Internationale de la Sculpture de Vancouver) is an open-air museum for Contemporary Art in Canada. It is a non-profit charitable organization that mounts a major outdoor sculpture exhibition, biennially. Each exhibition is accessible for a two-year period, featuring international artists, New Media and Performance Art, in the cities of Vancouver, New Westminster, North Vancouver, Squamish and Richmond public spaces. The sculpture is in situ and is open to the public 24/7, 365 days a year.

== History ==
Vancouver Biennale was founded by Barrie Mowatt in 2002. It is now in its third biennial featuring 38 installations from China, Spain, Italy, Poland, Lithuania, Korea, India, UK, USA, France, Mexico, Denmark, and Iran. The first bienniale that ran from 2005-2007 was called by the namesake of the charity, Vancouver International Sculpture Biennale. It featured 24 public works of art from 11 countries. The second exhibition with the theme "In-Transit-ion" concluded in 2011 while the next biennale started in 2014.

== Format ==
Vancouver Biennale has a distinguishing component. It is committed to community outreach through its education program and has been responsible for the implementation of various community-based interactive programs. These include intra-school photo competitions, interactive self-guided tours and a K-Crew detective that enables students to learn more about the sculpture and their locations.

The Vancouver Biennale Legacy Foundation is another component, committed to leaving a legacy of public art in the city by acquiring major pieces of sculpture from each exhibition and offering them to Vancouver and the surrounding area for long-term display. The legacy programme ensures that the city benefits from a legacy of internationally acclaimed works of art for generations to come.

Sculptures proposed to this purpose from the 2009-2011 exhibit were selected based on a ‘Curator’s Choice’ and a ‘People’s Choice’. These choices were submitted to the appropriate municipal department for standard review and consultation.

== Activity ==
=== 2014-2016 Biennale ===
The 3rd Vancouver Biennale exhibition began in Spring 2014 with a curatorial theme of "Open Borders/Crossroads Vancouver." The 2014 – 2016 participants include globally recognized figures ranging from Ai Weiwei, Vik Muniz, Andy Goldsworthy to Os Gêmeos.

=== 2009-2011 Biennale ===
The 2009–2011 Vancouver Biennale featured major works from 5 continents with the focus on Asia. By the end of the 2009-2011 biennial, ten lectures by 6 artists will have taken place including one by Landscape Architect, Charles Jencks.

This Biennale had the theme of "In-transit-ion" and expanded beyond monumental sculpture installations in parks, bike lanes and urban plazas, to include New Media and Performance Installations on the new Canada Line rapid transit system. Works include Dennis Oppenheim’s "Engagement" (USA), Jaume Plensa's "We" (Spain), Magdalena Abakanowicz’s "Walking Figures" (Poland) from the City of San Diego, Michel Goulet’s "Echoes" (Canada), Sorel Etrog’s "King and Queen" (Canada), John Clement’s "Jasper" (USA) and Bernar Venet’s "217.5 Arcs x 13" (France).

=== Collaborative projects ===
From 26 April – 13 June 2010, the Richmond Art Gallery and Vancouver Biennale presented In Transition: New Art from India. This indoor exhibition featured installation-based work by contemporary artists such as Shilpa Gupta, Reena Kallat, TV Santosh, Sudarshan, Shetty, Thukral & Tagra and Hema Upadhyay. The exhibition will move to the Surrey Art Gallery in February 2011.

In October 2009, the Vancouver International Sculpture Biennale (in collaboration with the Vancouver Cycling Coalition) launched BIKEnnale, a bike riding tour of the sculptures. This event now takes place annually.

== Legacies ==
The following sculptures have been installed for permanent viewing:

Jasper by Brooklyn-based artist John Clement. (Robson and Jervis Streets)

A-maze-ing Laughter by Beijing-based artist Yue Minjun. (Morton Park at Davie and Denman)

217.5 Arc X 13 by French conceptual artist Bernar Venet (Sunset Beach Park)

Echoes by Canadian artist Michel Goulet (Kitsilano Beach Park)

Engagement by American artist Dennis Oppenheimer (Sunset Beach Park)

Walking Figures by Polish artist Magdalena Abakanowicz (Broadway and City Hall Canada Line Station)

Walking Figures by Polish artist Magdalena Abakanowicz (North Vancouver)

== News and Events ==
The Vancouver Biennale came to notoriety through the theft of the hare from Sophie Ryder's Minotaur and Hare sculpture that is in Van Dusen Gardens.

The Vancouver Biennale has also been in the news extensively over the Lenin and Miss Mao sculpture by the Gao Brothers.

The Vancouver Straight Newspaper included Yue Minjun's 'A-maze-ing Laughter' in their 2010 contributors' picks: Outdoors & landmarks. The laughing figures are the iconic signature of the artist and a product of the Cynical Realism art movement that emerged in China in the early 1990s.

The Vancouver Biennale has allowed a number of artists their Canadian artistic debut. Sudarshan Shetty is one such artist who is part of a growing number of young contemporary Indian artists who are internationally recognized for art that abandons or finds new ways of expressing, religious subject matter.

In 2010, Soren Dahlgaard created his Dough Portraits with the Vancouver International Sculpture Biennale, for the first time in North America and for the first time in the open air.
