= Dialogue (1989) =

1989 performance and installation artwork by Chinese artist Xiao Lu

Xiao Lu’s Dialogue (1989) at the China Avant-Garde Exhibition.

Dialogue was an art installation produced as part of a collaboration between Chinese artists Xiao Lu (born 1962) and Tang Song. On February 5, 1989, Xiao Lu fired two shots at the installation at the National Art Museum of China in Beijing, leading to the closure of the China/Avant-Garde Exhibition just two hours after its opening due to police intervention. This act was entirely outside the official exhibition plan and caused a major sensation in both Chinese and international art circles.

Initially, the work was regarded as a collaboration between Xiao Lu and male artist Tang Song, addressing themes of politics, law, and survival. In 2004, Xiao Lu publicly stated that she was the sole creator of Dialogue and reinterpreted its meaning from a female perspective. This sparked renewed debates over the authorship of the work, drawing significant attention from art critics.

== Creation process ==
Dialogue combines installation and performance art. The installation consists of two modified standard public telephone booths, custom-made by Xiao Lu at the Hangzhou Telecom Bureau. Placed side by side with a 90 cm gap, each booth features a photograph of a man or woman using a phone with their back turned. A mirror, facing the viewer, is positioned in the gap. A white rectangular pedestal on the floor holds a red telephone with its receiver hanging down, symbolizing failed communication. The original exhibition was intended to feature only this static installation.

The shooting was entirely unplanned by the National Art Museum of China and the exhibition committee, as performance art was prohibited in official exhibitions at the time. Carefully premeditated, Xiao Lu borrowed a handgun from her friend Li Songsong, who grew up in a military family in Beijing, and secretly brought it into the exhibition. After clearing the audience near the installation, she fired two shots at the glass between the telephone booths, leaving two bullet holes before immediately leaving the scene. Amid the chaos, fellow exhibiting artist Tang Song, who had shouted "Shoot!" while watching, was mistaken as one of the shooters and arrested for endangering public safety. Xiao Lu turned herself in later that afternoon.

== Changing meaning of the artwork ==
When the Tiananmen Square massacre occurred four months later, her actions were heavily politicized, referred to as "the first gunshots of Tiananmen". In their initial statement on the work, Xiao Lu and Tang Song jointly declared that the act was not destructive art. Tang Song emphasized that it continued his "Critical Point" concept, aiming to test legal boundaries and public opinion, while Xiao Lu remained silent.

Xiao Lu's Dialogue (1988) at the Hangzhou Academy of Fine Arts graduation exhibition.

Not until 2004 did Xiao Lu publicly declare herself the sole author of Dialogue and reinterpret its meaning. She stated that the telephone booth installation originated from her 1988 graduation exhibition at Hangzhou Academy of Fine Arts.Her mentor, Song Jianmin, had suggested that the installation was "too complete and clean" and discussed breaking it with a slingshot or an air gun. However, as she was unable to obtain a gun in time, the idea was postponed until the China/Avant-Garde Exhibition . Beyond the pursuit of artistic perfection, Xiao Lu noted that the shooting was not only a challenge to the integrity of the work but also deeply tied to her personal experiences.She saw it as both a reflection of communication struggles in romantic relationships and a symbolic act of resistance against childhood abuse.

Xiao Lu believed that Tang Song's actual involvement in Dialogue mainly occurred after the exhibition, as he interpreted the work's meaning while in prison. Tang Song himself never commented on this. In 1989, Xiao Lu's decision to relinquish interpretative authority to Tang Song and remain silent was closely tied to her social environment. At the time, feminism had yet to become a mainstream discourse in the Chinese art world, and she was deeply influenced by traditional moral values, making her reluctant to speak openly about sexual assault. Furthermore, during her detention, she developed a romantic relationship with Tang Song, which prevented her from asserting her authorship at the time. She later withdrew from the art world, willingly immersing herself in a relationship dominated by Tang Song.

== Relevant art criticism and influence ==
From 1989 to 2004, the work was widely recognized as a collaboration between female artist Xiao Lu and male artist Tang Song, regarded as a significant piece tied to themes of politics, law, and survival. Before 2004, art criticism, led by Li Xianting, generally viewed it as "a unique phenomenon in Chinese modern art, inseparable from its environment and time, marking the first instance where Chinese avant-garde art pursued human ingenuity as an artistic goal." While its avant-garde nature was highly acknowledged, it also became a taboo subject due to its association with the Tiananmen incident.

Until 2004, when Xiao Lu and Tang Song ended their relationship, she publicly declared herself the sole author of Dialogue, reinterpreting the work from a female perspective, with authorship becoming a central issue. Li Xianting maintained his stance that Dialogue was a collaboration between Tang Song and Xiao Lu, arguing that the work's social impact aligned with Tang Song's intentions rather than Xiao Lu's original focus on male-female relationships. In contrast, critics such as Gao Minglu and Xu hong supported Xiao Lu. Gao saw Dialogue as an expression of Xiao Lu's life and emotions as a woman, highlighting the gap between individual and societal dialogue.Xu argued that the work sought communication between men and women, as well as between women and society, with the shooting serving as an outlet for emotional release.

The authorship controversy of Dialogue not only reflects issues of artistic identity in contemporary art but also highlights gendered power structures in art historiography. After 2004, Xiao Lu redefined her work as a female artist, gradually moved towards feminist art practice, making this process itself a significant case in Chinese contemporary art's discourse on authorship and women's agency.
