= Xiao Lu =

Chinese artist (born 1962)

Xiao Lu 肖鲁
- Born: April 1962 (age 64); Hangzhou 杭州, China
- Known for: Performance Art, Installation Art

Xiao Lu (Chinese: 肖鲁; born 1962) is a Chinese artist specializing in Performance art and Installation art. She became famous in 1989, when she participated in the 1989 China/Avant-Garde Exhibition with her work Dialogue. Just two hours after the exhibition opened, she suddenly shot her own work with a gun, causing an immediate shutdown of the exhibition. When the Tiananmen Square massacre occurred four months later, her actions were heavily politicized, referred to as “the first gunshots of Tiananmen”.

== Early life and education ==
Xiao Lu was born in Hangzhou, China, in April 1962. She came from a revolutionary family with both of her parents being Socialist Realist artists; a tradition that she rebelled against.

In July 1984, Xiao Lu graduated from Beijing's Central Academy of Fine Arts Middle School.

In 1988 she graduated from the Oil Painting department of the Zhejiang Academy of Fine Arts in Hangzhou, where she was the daughter of the President of the academy.

In her 2010 novel Dialogue (2010), Xiao Lu reveals that she was sexually abused by a guardian trusted by her parents who came from the older generation of Socialist Realist art. She states that she telephoned this man not long after shooting her artwork Dialogue in 1989, although she has not confirmed whether or not he is related to her decision to shoot the artwork.

== The China/Avant-Garde Exhibition 1989 ==
Preparations for the China/Avant-Garde Exhibition began in 1986. It was the first time that an art exhibition for contemporary Chinese artists had been organized and curated solely by Chinese organizers. After having been postponed in 1987 by the launch of the Chinese Communist Party's political movement, “Against Bourgeois Liberalization”, the exhibition finally received official permission to open at the National Art Museum of China in Beijing on 5 February 1989.

At around 11:10 am on 5 February 1989 – two hours after the China/Avant-Garde Exhibition opened – Xiao Lu fired two shots into her own work, Dialogue, with a gun. The exhibition was immediately closed after the gunshot by the officials of the museum. Xiao Lu was arrested. The exhibition later re-opened.

The Tiananmen Square massacre occurred just four months later, on June 4, 1989. After the incident, Xiao Lu's gunshots became incredibly politicized, referred to as “the first gunshots of Tiananmen”, and the China Avant-Garde Exhibition described as “the little Tiananmen Square”. The reason for this reaction is that, against the political landscape at the time, the China/Avant-Garde Exhibition was a controversial call for democracy, and Xiao Lu's gunshots were incredibly provocative both for the National Art Museum of China and for the official authorities. However, she was regarded as a hero and an inspirational figure by the political and cultural activists in China at that time. She was the first female artist having such achievements in the severely sexist Chinese art community.

=== Dialogue (1989) ===
Xiao Lu's infamous work at the China/Avant-Garde Exhibition, Dialogue (1989), shows a man and a woman talking to each other in phone booths; between them is a red phone with its receiver dangling off the hook. Dialogue (1989) could be called China's first major feminist contemporary work of art.

In an interview in the Sydney Morning Herald in 2014, Xiao Lu clarified that her reasons for the gunshots were not political, but also embraced the political interpretations of them, stating, “I created the work out of personal feelings, but this work became interpreted with political meanings…I don't reject this. I've come to understand that with this work, making it for myself is one thing, but how it is interpreted is also a big part of it.”

== Later work ==
After staying in Australia for eight years (1989-1997), Xiao Lu returned to her hometown of Hangzhou in 1997 and continued to create art up until now.

On October 19, 2003, Xiao Lu created 15 Shots… From 1989 to 2003(2003). She framed the photograph of the gunshots and brought it to a shooting range in Beijing, where bullets shattered the glass and pierced through the photograph and backing, leaving 15 bullet holes. This work is regarded as a response to her act of shooting at the China/Avant-Garde Exhibitionin 1989.

Xiao Lu's artwork Sperm (2006) consists of an installation piece and a documentary-style video chronicling her search for a sperm donor after a split from her longtime partner and a strong desire to have a baby. As Chinese women were not allowed IVF treatment if they weren't married, she consulted a Western doctor who promised to perform the procedure if she could collect and freeze the sperm. The work documents her ultimate failure to fulfill this requirement.

Her project Wedding (2009) is a performance and recorded video of marrying herself. She started with lying in a black coffin and were held by four young men out of the car and into the museum. After finishing all the oaths, she put on a pair of wedding rings on her left and right hands respectively and declared her marriage with herself.

In 2010, Xiao Lu published a novel named after her most famous work, Dialogue (2010), which was presented as a fictitious tale based on real-life people and events.

Her artwork Love Letter (2011) is an installation piece composed of charcoal and Chinese herbal medicine, which she took to keep herself healthy during her pregnancy. She wrote down her inner thoughts and sentiments on pieces of xuan paper, each taking the form of a secret.

== Boycotting 'In Our Time: Four Decades of Art from China and Beyond- the Geoff Raby Collection' ==
The 2024 Sydney Festival event titled 'In Our Time: Four Decades of Art from China and Beyond – The Geoff Raby Collection' features a piece by Xiao Lu. However, the artist not only declined the invitation to participate in any related activities but also encouraged the public to boycott the exhibition. This decision is rooted in Xiao Lu's principled stance against Geoff Raby, the former Australian Ambassador to China and a prominent collector of Chinese contemporary art.

Xiao Lu's refusal to participate and her call for a boycott are linked to her objection to Geoff Raby's endorsement of the Chinese government, a regime known for its records of suppressing human rights. The artist's protest reflects a broader concern about the ethical implications of aligning with individuals who support or legitimize a government with a history of human rights violations.
