= Songzhuang =

Songzhuang could refer to the following towns in China:

- Songzhuang, Mengjin County (送庄镇), in Mengjin County, Henan

Written as "宋庄镇":

- Songzhuang art colony, in Tongzhou District, Beijing
- Songzhuang, Yu County, Hebei, in Yu County, Hebei
- Songzhuang, Ganyu County, in Ganyu County, Jiangsu
