= Songzhuang art colony =

The Songzhuang art colony (simplified Chinese: 宋庄艺术区; traditional Chinese: 宋莊藝術區; pinyin: Sòngzhuāng Yìshùqū), located in Songzhuang town of Tongzhou district in the eastern suburbs of Beijing, is the most famous and largest artist community in Beijing. More than 2,000 artists live there.

Originally representing the avant-garde, the area now accommodates artists who work in varying styles, ranging from the avant-garde to the academic. Sculptors and photographers also call the area home.

== The character of Songzhuang art colony ==
The previously institutionalized and socially motivated art system produced many of the initial artists of the Chinese avant-garde. Were it not for the breakaway radicals of the last two decades, there would be no artistic community in Songzhuang. Although the community's current concerns are perhaps more financial than sociological, the shift toward the foreign market in the 1980s and the rise of the nouveau riche at the beginning of the new century have reshaped the landscape. Today, it is both the growing upper middle class in cosmopolitan cities and foreign collectors and galleries that are the prominent patrons of contemporary art in China. However, one would have to be extremely cynical to suggest that the creative process has become entirely money-oriented for modern artists living there. Far from it, in fact, a spirit of idealism, a “Songzhuang spirit” well and truly exists, and can even be examined from a historical perspective, where the roots of the artistic community can be traced back to Yuanmingyuan, the grounds of the Old Summer Palace in the north-east of Beijing. It was there that in the 1980s, like-minded free spirits congregated, living relatively poorly, though freely, escaping from the rat race and pressures of modern society. Artists arrived from all over China, celebrating a creative community and period of intense artistic exploration.

== Searching for tranquility ==
A trend was established for artists to migrate away from the cities and to form their own communities such as the famous Beijing East Village. It brought far-reaching consequences for the Chinese avant-garde scene, as focus shifted away from the emerging capitalistic distractions and political pressures and opportunity was given in a tranquil environment for inner reflection and deep contemplation. However, problems arose once the community began attracting attention/notoriety from the media, gallery owners and other quarters, making artistic life more difficult as the once relaxed and free atmosphere came under closer scrutiny. The 1993 documentary Seeking Dreams on the Verge, by the director Zhang Jiarui, explores these issues.

In an effort to preserve the spirit of the avant-garde, Fang Lijun, Zhang Huiping and Yue Minjun took the bold initiative in the spring of 1994 to relocate from Yuanmingyuan to the farming area of Songzhuang Township, located between the Chaobai and Wenyu rivers in Tongzhou District, 20 km away from central Beijing. Liu Wei, Zhang Huiping, Wang Qiang and Gao Huijun were also in this first wave of artists to move. By the end of the year Yang Shaobin, Ma Ziheng, Zhang Jianqiang, Shao Zhenpeng, Liu Fenghua, Zhang Mingqiang, Wang Qiuren and Yao Junzhong joined them. With the accompaniment of renowned art critic Li Xianting, who later became known as "the Godfather of Songzhuang", a quite formidable group of talent had succeeded in keeping the flame burning for Chinese avant-garde art.

Here, the old style farmhouses, many with a small front courtyards or gardens, proved an ideal living and working space for the artists, more of whom would subsequently arrive following the official closure of the Yuanmingyuan community in 1995, this being in some part due to the latter’s proximity to Beijing’s university district. The communal artistic lifestyle and essence of the avant-garde was preserved and remained intact amongst the tribulations, albeit by transplantation to Songzhuang.

== Today ==
About present day Songzhuang, native artist Cheng Da Qing said, “The future of Chinese fine art is in Songzhuang”. The artistic community now has over one thousand artists, centered mainly in the village of Xiaopu and spreading throughout Tuanli, Liuhe, Daxing, Xindian, Lamazhuang, Renzhuang, Beisi, Baimiao and Xiaoyang. Painters, sculptors, photographers, writers, conceptual/new media artists and dreamers live side-by-side, the largest gathering of contemporary artists certainly in China if not in the world.

October 2005 saw the successful inauguration of an annual Songzhuang Art Festival, under the sponsorship of the Ministry of Culture, the Songzhuang Township Government, and the Songzhuang Art Promotion Society, when over six hundred works were shown along the 2 km main road in Xiaopu. The subsequent year’s festival used the newly constructed Songzhuang Art Museum and the East District Artistic Centre, strengthening Songzhuang's reputation as an arts community.

Travel to and from Beijing is convenient with local transport or taxi capable of making the journey in under an hour.
