= Gu Xiong (artist) =

Artist

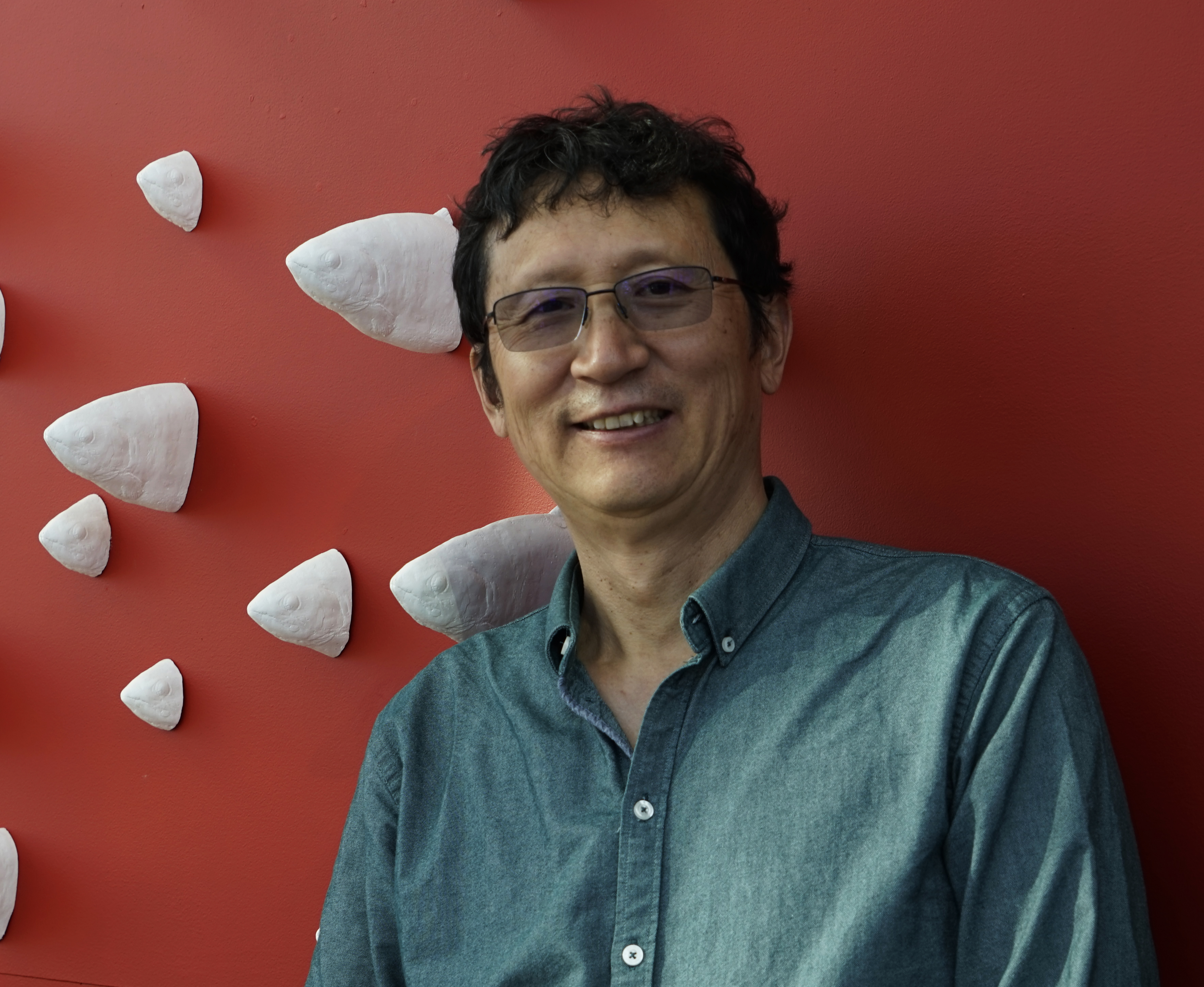
- Born: 1953 (age 72–73); Chongqing, China
- Occupations: Artist, professor
- Known for: installation artist, painter, graphic artist, photographer, performance artist
- Website: Official website

Gu Xiong (born 1953) is a Chinese-born Canadian contemporary artist.

== Life ==
Gu Xiong was born 1953 in Chongqing, Sichuan, China. At the age of 18, during the Chinese cultural revolution, Xiong was sent to live in the countryside where he sketched scenes of rural life. He received a Bachelor of Fine Arts and a Master of Fine Arts degree (1985) from the Sichuan Fine Arts Institute. In 1986, he attended an artist residency at the Banff Centre for the Arts in Alberta Canada, becoming the first artist from the People's Republic of China to do so. After returning to China, he was a part of the 1989 China Avant-Garde exhibition that was shut down by the Chinese police a few hours after it opened, four months before Tiananmen Square protests of 1989. Xiong immigrated from China to Vancouver Canada in 1989.

Xiong currently lives in Vancouver, where he is a professor of art at the University of British Columbia.

== Work ==
Xiong is a multidisciplinary artist who works in media as diverse as painting, drawing, photography, installation, performance, video and bronze sculpture. He is known largely for his paintings, performances and installation works. In Interior View-- Fenced Wall, performed in 1989 at the China Avant-garde exhibition in Beijing, he painted images of a fence on paper and onto his clothing and performed with his face painted in pantomime-style. He has also done numerous similarly titled works on paper.

== Selected solo and duo exhibitions ==
2020 – Gu Xiong: The Remains of a Journey, Centre A Vancouver International Centre for Contemporary Asian Art and Canton-sardine

2017 – Gu Xiong: Migration, The Galaxy Museum of Contemporary Art, Chongqing, China

2017 – Pins, R Space, Vancouver, British Columbia.

2016 – A River of Migration, a mixed media installation, at the San Juan Islands of Museum of Art, Friday Harbor, Washington, US.

2014 – Gu Xiong; a journey exposed, Gordon Smith Gallery of Canada, North Vancouver, British Columbia, Canada

2013 – Chongqing 5 – A Room Filled with Memories (Gu Xiong/Sheng Hua), ATELIER AM ECK, Himmelgeister Str. 107E. Düsseldorf, Germany

2012–13 -Invisible in the Light, Boya Art Museum, Central China Nomal University, Wuhan, China.

2012 – Coquitlam Waterscapes, Evergreen Art Gallery, Coquitlam, British Columbia. Canada

2012 – Waterscapes: Reframed, the Reach Gallery Museum Abbotsford, Abbotsford, Abbotsford, British Columbia, Canada

2011 – Waterscapes: Migration along the Vancouver Island, Fraser and Yangzi Rivers, Nanaimo Art Gallery

2010 – Waterscapes, solo exhibition at the Richmond Art Gallery, Richmond, British Columbia

2008 – Gu Xiong/Yang Shu, Beijing Center for the Arts at Legation Quarter, Beijing, China

2008 – Red River, Winnipeg Art Gallery, Winnipeg Manitoba, Canada.

2006 – Toronto: I Am Who I Am, a photo installation at the St. Patrick Subway Station, Toronto, Ontario, Canada.

2005 – Shifting, Diane Farris Gallery, Vancouver, British Columbia, Canada

2004 – Beyond Vision, Chongqing Art Museum, Chongqing, China

2004 – Here is What I Mean – Gu Xiong and Xu Bing, Museum London, London, Ontario, Canada

2003 – Small, medium, large, and Extra large, OBORO Gallery, Montreal, Quebec, Canada

== Selected group exhibitions ==
2017 – Every. Now. Then: Reframing Nationhood, Art Gallery of Ontario, Toronto, Ontario, Canada

2017 – Rip It Up, The 2nd Changjiang International Photography and Video Biennale, Chongqing Museum of Contemporary Art, Chongqing, China.

2016 – Mountains and Rivers Without End, Artlab Gallery, Western University, London, Ontario, Canada

2016 – Mountains and Rivers, Centre for Contemporary Art, Quito and Cuenca Modern Art Museum, Cuenca, Ecuador

2015–16 – Beyond Image, Hubei Art Museum of Art, Wuhan, China

2015 – Top Time, LP Art Space, Chongqing, China

2015 – Material Future: The Architecture of Herzog & De Meuron and the Vancouver Art Gallery, Vancouver Art Gallery, Vancouver, British Columbia, Canada

2015 – Home (Hyphenated Home), Centre 3 for Print and Media Arts, Hamilton, Ontario, Canada

2014–15 – The Transformation of Canadian Landscape Art: Inside & Outside of being, Xi’an Art Museum, Xi’an and Today’s Art Museum, Beijing, China

2014 -15 – Alex Colville, Art gallery of Ontario, Toronto; The National Gallery of Canada, Ottawa, Ontario, Canada

2014 – Confronting Anitya – Oriental Experience in Contemporary Art, Im Kunstraum Villa Friede, Stiftung Für Kunst und Kultur e. V., Bonn, Germany; Yuan Dian Art Museum, Beijing, China; Kunstwerk Carlshütte Internationalle Kunstausstellung NordArt 2014, Vorwerlsalle, 24782 Buedelsdorf, Deutschland, Germany.

2014 – The Source: Rethinking Water Through Contemporary Art, Roman Hall Art Centre, Brock University, St. Catharine’s, Ontario, Canada

2013 – Permanere Nell’impermanenza – Esperienza orientale e art contemporanea, Museo MAGI’900, Via Rusticana A/1, Bologna, Italy

2013 – Rivers, Lakes and Seas – Hubei International Contemporary Art Exhibition, Hubei Library Gallery, Wuhan, China

2013 – Voice of the Unseen: Chinese Independent art 1979 – Today, The Venice Biennale Parallel Exhibition, The Fondazione la Biennale di Venezia 55th International Art Exhibition, Arsenale Nord, Venice, Italy

2012 – Canadian Identity and Landscape, the Art Gallery of Mississauga, Mississauga, Ontario, Canada

2012 – Downstream: Reimagining Water, Concourse Gallery, Emily Carr University of Art & Design, Vancouver, British Columbia, Canada

2011 – Only when the Shades of Night Begin to Gather, AHVA Library Gallery, UBC, Vancouver, British Columbia, Canada

2011 – Revolutionizing Cultural Identity: Photography and the Changing Face of Immigration, Canadian Museum of Immigration at Pier 21, Halifax, Nova Scotia, Canada

2010 – Three Voices, OrganHaus Art Space, Chongqing, China

2010 – Border Zones: New Art Across Cultures, Museum of Anthropology, Vancouver, British Columbia, Canada

2010 – Do You See What I Mean? An exhibition of photographic works from the collection of the Canada

Council Art Bank conceived to coincide with X Ottawa Photography Festival and Culture Days, Ottawa, Ontario, Canada

2010 – Made in Canada, Shenkman Arts Centre, Ottawa School of Art, Orleans, Ontario, Canada

2009 – Documents of China/Avant-Garde Exhibition, Wall Gallery, Beijing, China

2009 – British Columbia Scene, National Arts Centre, Ottawa, Ontario, Canada

2008 – Art Is Nothing – 798 Art Festival, 798 Art District, Beijing, China

2008 – Revolutionizing Cultural Identity, Oakland University Art Gallery, Rochester, Michigan, US

2007 – Post Avant-garde Chinese Contemporary Art – Four Directions of the New Era, Anting House, Hong Kong, China

2007 – Gui Zhou 3rd Biennale, Gui Yang Art Museum, Gui Yang, China

== Selected publications ==
- Confronting Anitya: Oriental Experience in Contemporary Art
- Voice of the Unseen: Chinese Independent Art 1979 → Today (2013)
- Yellow River / Blue Culture (2002) (ISBN 9781895497502)
- The Transformation of Canadian Landscape Art: Inside and Outside of Being (2014)
- Starting From the Southwest (2007)
- The Sickle And The Cell Phone (ISBN 9780920810828)
- Tout Le Temps (Every Time) (2000) (ISBN 2-920825-17-8)
- Red River (2008)
- Red Lands (1998) (ISBN 9780969506881)
- A Journey Exposed (2014) (ISBN 9780993771408)
- Contemporary East Asian Letter Arts (1999)
- Drowning (2000)
- Waterscapes (2010)
- Coquitlam Waterscapes (2012)
- Here Not There (1995) (ISBN 9781895800913)
- Post Avant-Garde Chinese Contemporary Art (2007)
- Shu: Reinventing Books in Contemporary Chinese Art (2006) (ISBN 9780977405411)
- Gu Xiong and Xu Bing: Here is What I Mean (2004) (ISBN 9781895800913)
- Beyond Image: Laboratory of Light (2015)
- Confronting Anitya: Oriental Experience in Contemporary Art (2013)
- Gu Xiong: Migrations (2017)
- Gu Xiong: The Remains of a Journey (2021)

== Collections ==
Xiong's work is included in the permanent collection of the National Gallery of Canada, the Vancouver Art Gallery, the Surrey Art Gallery and the Burnaby Art Gallery, The China National Museum of Fine Arts, Art Bank, Canada Council for the Arts, The Museum of Modern Art, Ljubljana, Yugoslavia, Museum of Sichuan Institute of Fine Arts, Chengdu Modern Art Exhibition Hall, Washington State Arts Commission, University of Washington, York University, The Banff Centre for the Arts, The Glenbow Museum, Calgary, Alberta, Canada, Morris and Helen Belkin Art Gallery, University of British Columbia, Xi’an Art Museum, The Peter Wall Institute, University of British Columbia, Vancouver, British Columbia, Canada, Simon Fraser University Art Gallery, British Columbia Art Collection, Surrey Art Gallery, Richmond Art Gallery, and Kamloops Art Gallery.
