= Execution (disambiguation) =

Execution is the act of putting a person to death, in execution of a judicial sentence of death, which is also known as capital punishment.

Execution may also refer to:

== Society ==
- A term for contract killings
- Extrajudicial killing, the killing of a person by governmental authorities without the sanction of any judicial proceeding or legal process
- Summary execution, the act of killing a person who is accused of a crime without benefit of a full and fair trial
- A writ of execution, ordering the enforcement of a judgment, typically by seizing and selling goods to satisfy a judgment debt

== Technology ==
- Execution (computing), the process in which a computer carries out instructions of a computer program

== Media and art ==
- Execution (novel), a 1958 fictional work by the Canadian author and war veteran Colin McDougall
- Execution (painting), a 1995 Chinese art painting
- "Execution" (Scott & Bailey), a 2011 television episode
- "Execution" (The Twilight Zone), a 1960 television episode
- Execution (1968 film), a 1968 Italian film
- Execution, also known as Stark Raving Mad, a 1981 American film
- Execution (album), an album by Tribuzy
- Execution: The Discipline of Getting Things Done, a 2002 business book by Larry Bossidy and Ram Charan

== See also ==
- Execute (disambiguation)
- The Execution (disambiguation)
