= Execute =

Execute may refer to:

- Execute (album), a 2001 Garage hip-hop album by Oxide & Neutrino
- USS Execute (AM-232), an Admirable-class minesweeper
- "Execute", the first track on Slipknot's 2008 album All Hope Is Gone

== See also ==
- Execution (computing), the running of a computer program
- Execution (disambiguation)
