= Wang Guangyi =

Chinese artist (born 1957)

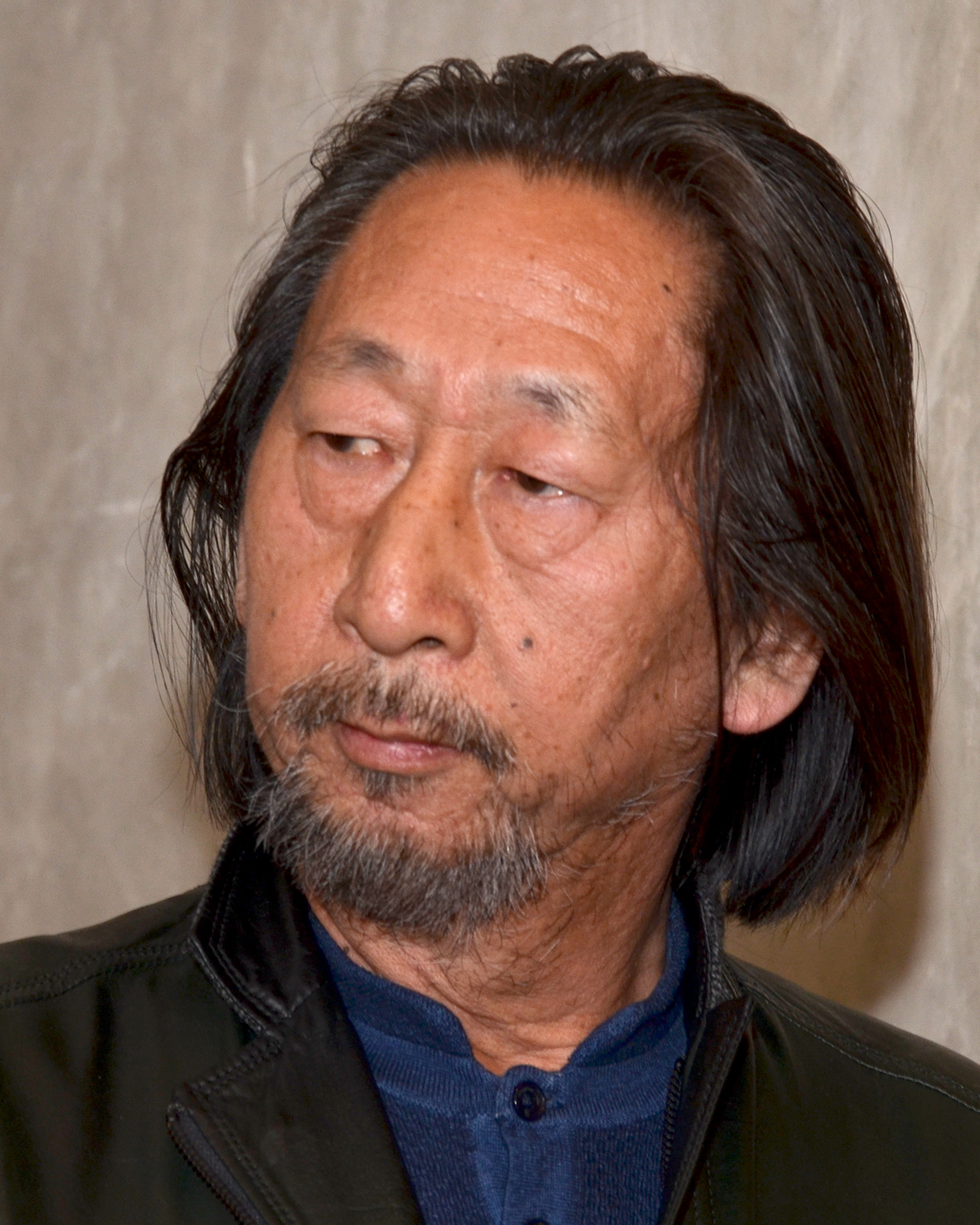
- Wang Guangyi in 2018
- Born: 王广义; 1957 (age 68–69); Harbin, Heilongjiang, China
- Movement: Political Pop
- Website: wangguangyi.artron.net (in Chinese)

Wang Guangyi (Chinese: 王广义; born 1957) is a Chinese artist. He is known as a leader of the new art movement that started in China after 1989, and for his Great Criticism series of paintings, which combine socialist imagery, particularly from the Cultural Revolution (1966–1976), and Western consumer brand logos. Wang is typically considered a Political Pop artist. He states that his goal as an artist is to revive a "socialist spirit".

== Life ==
Wang Guangyi was born in Harbin, Heilongjiang Province in 1957. Wang's father was a railway worker in northeastern China. Like many other people, Wang experienced the influence of the Cultural Revolution and had to work in a rural village for three years. He too became a railway worker. Wang tried for four years to get into a college. After several failed attempts, he enrolled at Zhejiang Academy of Fine Arts. He graduated from the oil painting department of the academy in 1984. He lives and works in Beijing, China.

== Artwork ==
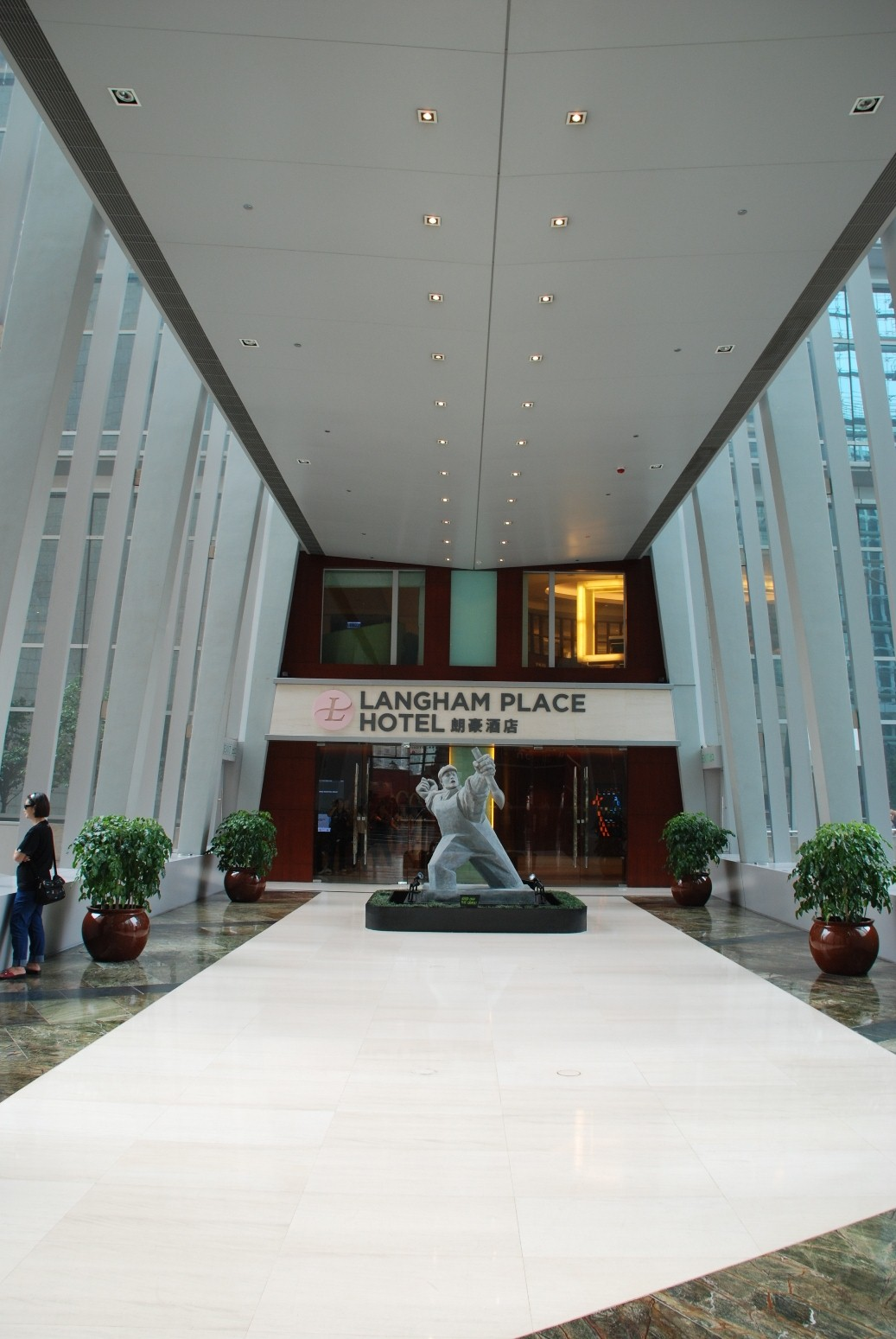
Langham Place Atrium overpass between the Langham Place Hotel and the Langham Place Mall. The statue is part of the Materialist Series by Wang Guangyi

His work is considered in China to be in the Political Pop genre. His work re-examines socialist imagery and he states that his goal as an artist is to revive a "socialist spirit".

=== Early works ===
The North Pole is a recurring theme in Wang's early works; it is seen not in relation to its geographic characteristics, but as a symbolic place where a new faith is born, in which the individual must deal principally with himself, but without freeing himself from the social. Working on the Frozen North Pole cycle (1984-1985), the group of young Artists of the North, of which Wang was a part, chose to confront themselves with Western philosophy. In his Post-Classical series (1986-1988) Wang worked on a synthetic revision of the great works of Western art tied to themes of religion, morality, faith and ideology. These paintings use various grey tones and encapsulate the human figure and its environment without many details. Wang's objective consisted in elaborating a style that deviated from that of classic art, an expressive strategy which derived from his reading of Ernst Gombrich, and Gombrich's theory of inherited "schemata". According to Wang, "It is Gombrich who has given me notions about schema/cultural revisions as well as continuity."

Acting on his interpretation of Gombrich, Wang in his Post-Classical series, Red Rationality series, and Black Rationality series revises and reinterprets iconic imagery of Western art such as Pietà, Mona Lisa, and The Death of Marat.

Wang first incorporated socialist imagery into his work with his 1988 piece Waving Mao Zedong: Black Grid. Wang created the piece by drawing six horizontal lines and five vertical lines in a grid on a black and white photograph of Mao Zedong waving to a crowd from the Tiananmen Square rostrum during the Cultural Revolution.

Wang also used this grid technique in his Mao Zedong: Red Grid No. 1, a triptych which obtained significant attention during the China/Avant-Garde Exhibition at China Art Gallery in early 1989. Wang describes the grid as a reference to the method for transferring portraits of Mao to larger canvasses for display during the Cultural Revolution. Wang ultimately created a total of five Mao under grid artworks. He later described these works as a major turning point in his career.

=== Great Criticism, 1990-2007 ===
Great Criticism is Wang's most famous cycle of works. These works, all of them medium-sized oil paintings, combine socialist imagery, such as Cultural Revolution imagery, with Western consumer brands. The compositional device of the works is juxtaposition. According to Wang, "the real issue exposed in Great Criticism is the conflict between Western culture and socialist ideology." He describes this conflict as one that cannot be dissolved through irony or sarcasm, but which is an enduring conflict with global ramifications.

He first received significant international attention in 1992 when his piece Great Criticism: Coca-Cola appeared on the cover of an issue of Flash Art: The Leading European Art Magazine. Wang has given various accounts of his inspiration for the Great Criticism series, including that he was inspired when, while working in his studio and drinking a Coca-Cola, he caught sight of a cigarettes pack lying on an old political poster.

=== 1990s ===
The series and installations VISA (1995-1998), Passport (1994-1995), and Virus Carriers (1996-1998) contain images of infants, grown adults and dogs accompanied by their respective names, places, dates of birth and genders. The aforementioned titles of these works are then imprinted upon these images. By forefronting the bureaucratic procedures tied to moving from one country to another, these works reveal that the organization of the State enacts its own defenses when evaluating the potential danger of individuals. Wang Guangyi perceives a well-established climate of reciprocal suspicion and looming danger, which ripened during the Cold War and still persists today, even if it has lost the oppressiveness born of forced indoctrination. Wang Guangyi's reflection deals with the relationship that Power has with the individual, on which it maintains control by increasing collective fears to then propose itself as a bastion against unknown dangers that could suddenly strike against defenseless people. The artist maintains that through these forms of psychological pressure, a tacit agreement that provides protection against the contagion of new viruses in exchange for the renouncement of a part of one's freedom is forged between the Power and the individual.

=== 2000s ===
During the 2000s the relationship between Wang's works and the transcendent increased. In fact the title given to the Materialist series (2001-2005) is not contradictory. This series of sculptures made from the images of twelve workers, farmers and soldiers that were taken from propaganda images. According to Wang Guangyi these propaganda images bring to light that the main force of the people, the anger expressed by their movements, derives from faith in ideology. With these sculptures the artist attempts to put an image to the general feeling of the people while referencing dialectic materialism - Materialist is a term that has particular import in Chinese history in that it summarizes the socialist ideology. At the same time, the artist also sees another level of meaning within the work. In art, things that possess certain conceptual qualities are called "the object", which in Chinese has the same root as the word "materialist", Wang has also represented the great political (Lenin, Stalin, Mao), spiritual (Christ) and spiritual and political leaders (John XXIII), as well as the philosophers whose thought continues to exert its influence today (Marx and Engels) in series of oil paintings entitled New Religion (2011). The images seem taken from photographic negatives, and though the artist uses a traditional oil painting technique in these works, the ambiguity created by the reference to photography breaks the familiarity that the spectator has with them, thereby opening up interpretations as to their meaning. Through this cycle of works Wang has asked himself about the commonalities between the great utopias, the fascination that they exert on humans, and why all men feel the need to find figures on which to place their faith. The installations that make up the cycle Cold War Aesthetics (2007-2008) contain historical reconstructions of the Cold War period. In these works, Wang deals with the psychological effects of the propaganda that was characteristic of the Chinese political climate of that time. In order to evoke a psychological reaction, the artist makes the spectators feel the emotion, climate and mentality of that era.

Wang's 2001 installation Elementary Education presents a series of 1967-1968 Chinese anti-war posters and graphics addressing safety in the event of a nuclear attack placed next to a construction scaffold, spade, and military boots. Wang intended to depict a work site where "everything is about to begin", leaving the question of what happens next to the viewer's imagination. Wang states that he sought to "show the education that our generation received and how, in the wake of the Cold War, we may continue to look at the current configuration of the world." Elementary Education first exhibited in Hamburg, Germany.

Wang's 2001-2002 sculptures Materialists depict socialist figures such as Red Guards in the confidence of youth. The sculptures are made of fiberglass and covered in millet. Wang describes his use of millet as an important element in the art work because "millet is full of revolutionary significance in China." (for example, millet was a staple for the Eighth Route Army during its fight against the Japanese invasion of China). Wang compares his use of millet to Joseph Beuys use of coarse felt, stating that just as one must understand the European tradition to understand Beuys' use of the fabric, one must understand the Chinese tradition to understand Wang's use of millet.

His 2007-2008 installation Cold War Aesthetics uses objections such as fiberglass sculptures, old posters, concrete blocks, and video to create scenes of Chinese citizens and militia preparing for nuclear, chemical, and biological attacks.

== Reception ==
Wang has developed considerable popular appeal, market success, and praise from art critics, particularly following his November 2002 retrospective exhibition.

Art critic Li Xianting states that by directing Cultural Revolution-style mass criticism against Western commercial culture, Wang's Great Criticism series achieves "a humorous and absurd effect that yet carries with it an implied cultural criticism."

In March 1991, Beijing Youth Daily included a special section on what it described as the "Wang Guangyi phenomenon," contending that his Great Criticism series was a sign of the increasing accessibility of modern art and therefore exemplified the idea of art "from the masses and to the masses".

Wang, like others such as Fang Lijun, has become a millionaire, one of China's nouveau riches. Such painters, with their large studios and expensive houses and cars, are in China called bopu dashi or "pop masters". Wang's successful career and fast growing wealth have drawn criticism. Some have questioned his artistic value, along with the price of his works. Some critics claim that Wang "has lost his artistic ingenuity, gives in to the market, and has also become dependent on repeating his already successful works".

== Solo exhibitions ==
Wang Guangyi has had a number of solo exhibitions, including:

- 1993: Galerie Bellefroid, Paris, France
- 1994: Hanart TZ Gallery, Hong Kong
- 1997: Galerie Klaus Littmann, Basel, Switzerland
- 2001: Faces of Faith, Soobin Art Gallery, Singapore
- 2003: Gallery Enrico Navarra, Paris, France
- 2004: Galerie Urs Meile, Lucerne, Switzerland
- 2006: Arario Gallery, Seoul, Korea
- 2007: Galerie Thaddaeus Ropac, Paris, France
- 2008: Visual Politics, He Xiangning Art Museum, Shenzhen, China
- 2008: Cold War Aesthetics, Louise Blouin Institute, London
- 2011: The Interactive Mirror Image, Tank Loft, Chongqing Contemporary Art Center, Chongqing, China
- 2012: Thing-In-Itself: Utopia, Pop and Personal Theology, Today Art Museum, Beijing, China
- 2012: Cold War Aesthetics, Pujiang Oversea Chinese Town, Shanghai, China
