= The Execution =

The Execution may refer to:

- The Execution (film), a 2021 Russian mystery thriller film
- The Execution (1985 film), a television movie with Michael Kearns
- "The Execution", a song by Spoon from their 1998 album A Series of Sneaks

== See also ==
- Execution (disambiguation)
