= A-maze-ing Laughter =

Sculpture by Yue Minjun in Vancouver, British Columbia, Canada

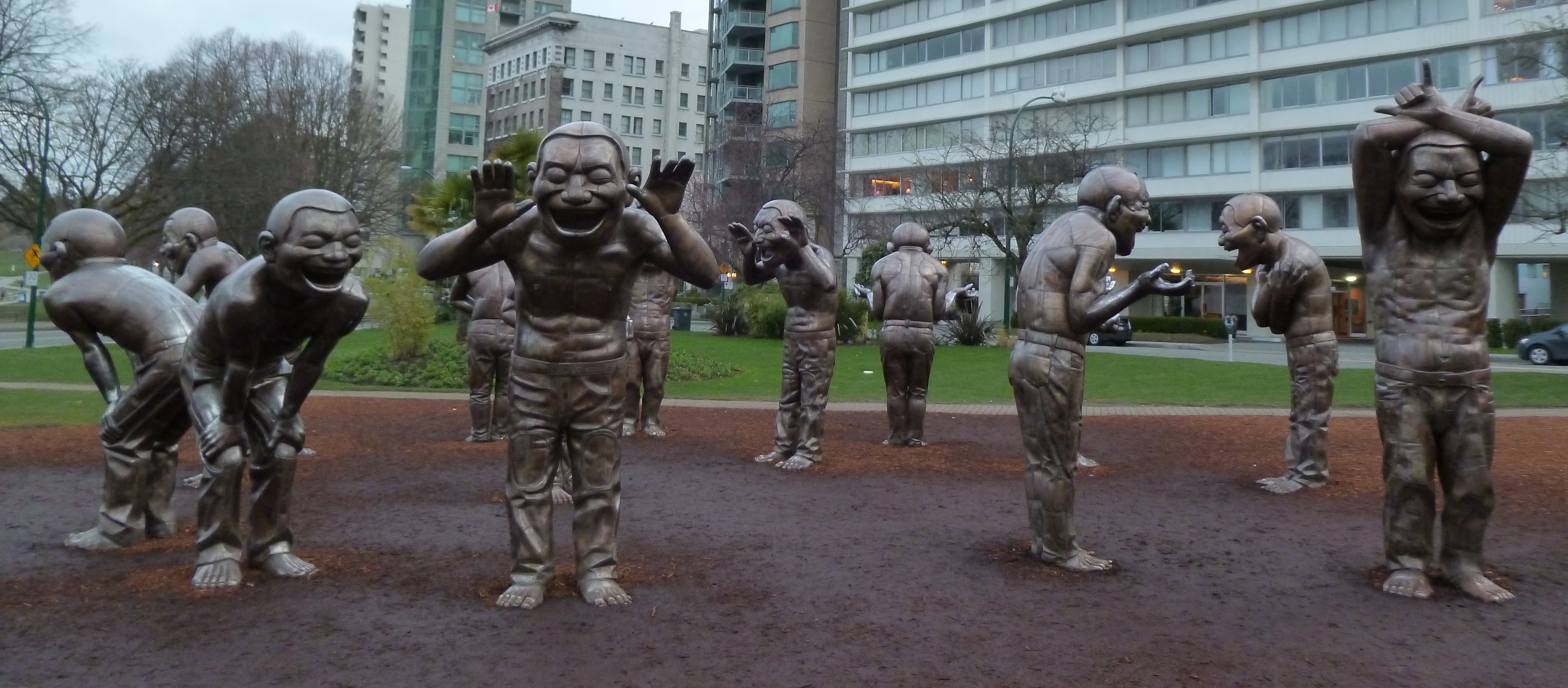
- The installation in 2013
- Artist: Yue Minjun
- Year: 2009
- Type: Sculpture
- Medium: Bronze
- Subject: Yue Minjun
- Dimensions: 259 cm (102 in) tall
- Location: Vancouver, British Columbia; 49.2876°N 123.142°W
- Owner: City of Vancouver

A-maze-ing Laughter is a 2009 bronze sculpture by Yue Minjun, located in Morton Park in Vancouver, British Columbia, Canada.

== Description ==
A-maze-ing Laughter was designed by Yue Minjun and installed in Morton Park (Davie and Denman) along the English Bay in West End, Vancouver, in 2009. The patinated bronze sculpture, composed of 14 statues each about three metres tall and weighing over 250 kilograms, portrays the artist's own image "in a state of hysterical laughter". It was created as part of the Vancouver International Sculpture Biennale, which exhibits international contemporary works in public spaces. The sculpture was donated to the City of Vancouver by Chip and Shannon Wilson through the Wilson5 Foundation on August 11, 2012.

As part of the installation, an inscription carved into cement seating states "May this sculpture inspire laughter playfulness and joy in all who experience it."

== Reception ==
A-maze-ing Laughter was nominated in the Great Places in Canada Contest 2013 and was the only work of public art to receive a nomination.

== See also ==
- 2009 in art
