= Fang Lijun =

Chinese artist (born 1963)

Fang Lijun (Chinese: 方力钧; born 1963) is a Chinese artist based in Beijing. He was born into a wealthy family with a high social status. In the 1990s, there was a cultural movement in China referred to as Cynical Realism of which Fang Lijun was a member. Living in China during this critical time shaped his worldview in terms of his views on art, human values and morality.

== Biography ==
Fang Lijun attended Children Cultural Place school. During his time at school, he met Li Xianting (who would later be a famous critic) and was introduced to watercolors, oil paints and ink.

Fang Lijun decided to leave high school to pursue his artistic dream. He made a decision to go to Hebei Light Industry Technology school to study ceramics for three years. However, Fang Lijun did not want to stop his studies there. Instead of having an intellectual job in the ceramics department, he prepared himself to take the entrance exam to enroll at the Central Academy of Fine Arts in Beijing. He was fascinated by the medium of oil painting and chose it for his final graduation project.

At the beginning of 1992, Fang Lijun moved to Yuanmingyuan village in north-west Beijing. Due to the economy and other difficult cultural issues, painters wanted to create a utopia where they could freely paint and express themselves. That was when Yuanmingyuan village drew artists' attention. At the time, painters like Fang Lijun had to face many obstacles and challenges, particular financial issues. In order to be able to paint, they needed to have funds to buy materials. However, there was no certainty that they would receive any funding, so it was extremely difficult for painters to be able to follow what they love. Fang Lijun and other artists like him had to paint for a living due to the economic pressure.

== Style ==
Fang Lijun made a large number of works featuring the subject "bald heads". Under the influence of his family and friends, his art expresses the freedom, the integrity in two different settings: traditional and modern era, and the will of making a change. He explained in an interview that he wished to send a message about the lives of painters through bald-head figures. The bald headed traditional Chinese men are viewed as dumb or stupid. Through these figures, he is sending a message about morality and how people define what is normal based on physical appearance, rather than internal moral character. Fang Lijun values the individual stories of each person. He is asking the society to look at painters as normal people, as people who are making a change, rather than as eccentric outcasts.

In his paintings, he also uses elements of water and flower a lot. Water plays a big role in Fang Lijun's paintings. In an interview, he explained that water is helping him convey a message about his feeling and his voice about the truth and what is going in Chinese society. His famous work with water is a man being drowned in water. Part of the reason for this painting relates to his childhood experience when he was almost drowned. The second and most important part in relation to this painting is that he is expressing his feelings about the Chinese society. When the man is drowning in the water, it represents painters like Fang Lijun. He feels like he does not have a voice, that he is powerless in this societal structure and that he cannot even make his own decision or speak the truth. Also, his hope is to freely go and move in the water metaphorically. He is hoping to be able to speak for himself, for other artists and to inspire everyone.

He is one of the artists who is standing in the middle line between traditional and modern practice. For example, he still follows the process of the carving of wood with the negative image, coats it with ink and then impresses the image on the paper. Because art projects require different color immersion, Fang uses different plates and a set order of printing on different adjoined scrolls. Each scroll represents one individual against the mass which leads to "personal probity" in facing adversity.

== Cynical Realism ==
The earliest exhibition about the Cynical Realism was by Fang Lijun and Liu Wei. "Wanshi"-Cynical Realism'. The figures in Cynical Realism's paintings were cynical, distorted and accidental. In each of these painting, there is a sense of "self-mockery and ridiculous snippets of the surrounding circumstances". Different metaphysical questions and searches were discarded by this Cynical Realism. Fang Lijun said: "The bastard can be duped a hundred times but he still falls for the same old trick. We'd rather be called losers, bores, basket cases, scoundrels, or airheads, than ever be cheated again".

Fang Lijun is famous with his "illustrative style and bald-headed" figures. In these paintings, bald headed young men are in different motions: yawning, smiling, swimming, etc. Some of the figures are described as confusion or considered "dumbfounded by modern society". His figures represent the loss in direction of youths in China after 1989. Further more, some critics view these figures as inward looking monks which challenge the idea of orthodoxy. He has repeated painting stereotypical bald headed Chinese men with a "stupid" smiles. There was a shift in his painting before the 1990s and after the 1990s. Before, the relationship between the figures was easy to predict. The background was clearer with different details to help the "picture-reader" understand the paintings. However, after the 1990s, there was a big shift in the way he portrayed these figures. The relationship is hard to interpret when there usually was a big figure in the front and other small figures in the back. The background was not the main focus of the painting, but it still played a role. This shift leads to a new way of interpreting painting and allows everybody to read and challenge the idea of "representation". For some people this shift is considered a self-mockery and dealt with at a distance.

== 1991.6.1. painting ==
It is a woodblock print which consists of five fabric scrolls (490.9 cm x 606.2 cm in total approximately). This painting is a composition of a bald headed crowd with sky and clouds in a gray scale. The most important detail in this picture is the large head with an anonymous finger pointing to the sky. This figure is turning so only his left face is shown. He is looking at his finger with a very distinct smirk on his face. His right side is frozen and only some upper teeth are shown. Within a crowd, there are all bald heads facing upward to look to the sky or where the finger is pointing. Some of them have strong emotion by the facial expressions, some are reaching their hands and some look confused. The crowd is painted in a much denser level.

This painting reveals confusion and lost. The crowd does not know where to go and where to look. The gray scale of this painting reflects the uncertainty as well as the strong emotion of people during this era. There is a sense of loss in direction which represents the youths and artists in China who are uncertain about the future. Fang Lijan painted the crowd with non distinctive figures to reveal his feeling during that time. The definitions of self-identity and nation-identity are lost. The figures' faces are distorted from suffering through searching for something that is nowhere to be found. Some other critics view the large figure as a Christ-like image because Fang Lijun is influenced by Western culture and style.

== Other paintings ==
The Working Class Must Exercise Leadership in Everything, 1970: This painting has similar figures to the 1991.6.1 . There is a crowd with a large figure of Chairman Mao. However, instead of having a gray scale, this painting is painted in bright colors to represent a new hope that leads to empowerment and happiness. In this painting, Chairman Mao is considered a bright leader who will bring joy and peace to the country. People in the crowd have a happy and confident look under the direction or plan of Chairman Mao. The Chairman is drawn bigger than the other figures. The artist intentionally puts more focused details on the Chairman character to emphasise his role as a big brother or father that is pointing or leading people to a better place.

30th Mary: This painting is still under the Cynical Realists and bald head figures . In this painting, the background and the children are painted in bright colours . Besides, figures are located in the spiral pattern in which children are flying back to heaven. There are two different critical approaches to this picture. One approach is that this painting reveals a new hope for the young generation that can change the future of China. People have hopes on the youths that they can restructure or remodel the society so that everybody can have a voice and everybody lives in freedom. The other approach describes death as a relief from this life. Because life is too stressful or too complicated, death becomes the best solution to escape from this world to go to a more peaceful place such as heaven.

== "China/Avant-Garde" exhibition ==
This exhibition took place in February 1989. It was first denied access by the government. Some of the artists decided to move the artist's villages to begin to make a "department art". The target audience of the artists was not the public but other artists/painters among their circle of friends. Fang Lijun's works were shown during this exhibition. Due to the different economic and political times, there was a lot of attention that was being drawn from this exhibition among the artists. The intention was to motivate the movement of the society to reinforce a new structure of China. When the corruption happened, people started getting lost in direction of where to go or how to change the country. The China/Avant-garde called people together to make a bigger change, to fire up different movements that happened right after this exhibition.

== New Generation exhibition ==
This New Generation exhibition was held to draw people's attention to the Cynical Realism. This took place in July 1991 in the National History Museum in Beijing. There were many new major painters such as Fang Lijun, Liu Wei, Song Yonghong, who participated and helped with this event. This exhibition is known as a starter for the trend of realistic painting. In this event, Fang Lijun and other new painters introduced new ideas on society, painting and art critique. His paintings in this exhibition mostly focused on the national identity, cultural change and other related issues through stereotypical bald head men, family style and people's faces.

== Reception in Europe ==
In October 2002, when Rolf Lauter became director of the Kunsthalle Mannheim, he met Alexander Ochs, an art dealer from Berlin, and asked him about showing young artists from Asia, especially China, with his support in the museum. In 2003, Lauter presented loans from Fang Lijun, Yue Minjun and Yang Shaobin in his second re-presenting of the collection in a temporary exhibition on the subject of "SelfSpace" with 19th century portrait sculptures by Maillol and Rodin, light boxes by Jeff Wall and works by Alex Katz. Especially the work "SARS" (later named "Untitled") by Fang Lijun, a large-format woodcut, attracted attention. Lauter wrote in his introductory text: "Opposed to the pictures by Katz is a work composed of seven printed scroll paintings in the size 400 x 854 cm by the Chinese artist Fang Lijun. In addition to a rising tendency towards "de-individualisation" of people, his work labeled "SARS" also addresses the "glowing" danger of the virus for the crowds in China" Unfortunately, Lauter‘s purchase request was not fulfilled in Mannheim at the time. Today versions of the work are in the collections of the MoMA and the Centre Pompidou Paris.

== Exhibitions ==
- 1996: Human Images in an Uncertain Age, The Japan Foundation Asia Center, Tokyo.
- 1999: d'APERTutto, 48th Venice Biennale, Venice
- 2001: Asian Fine Art, Berlin.
- 2002: Between Beijing and Dali, Woodcuts and Paintings 1989-2002, Ludwig Forum Fur InternationaleKunst Aachen.
- 2003: Die Neue Kunsthalle II: natürlich – körperlich – sinnlich / The New Kunsthalle II: natural - physical - sensual, Kunsthalle Mannheim November 24, 2003 – March 7, 2004. Booklet: Rolf Lauter.
- 2004: Leben Ist Jetzt, Alexander Ochs Galleries Berlin, Beijing, Berlin, Germany.
- 2005: National Galerie/China Art Museum, Beijing, China.
- 2006: Kupferstichkabinett Staatliche Museen zu Berlin, Germany.
- 2016: Chinese Whispers, Museum of Fine Arts Bern, Bern, Switzerland

He has shown work internationally in exhibitions including The Next Ones at Alexander Ochs, Beijing, New Work, New Acquisitions at the Museum of Modern Art in New York City and Alors, la Chine? at the Pompidou Centre in Paris.
