= Zhang Peili (artist) =

Chinese contemporary artist (born 1957)

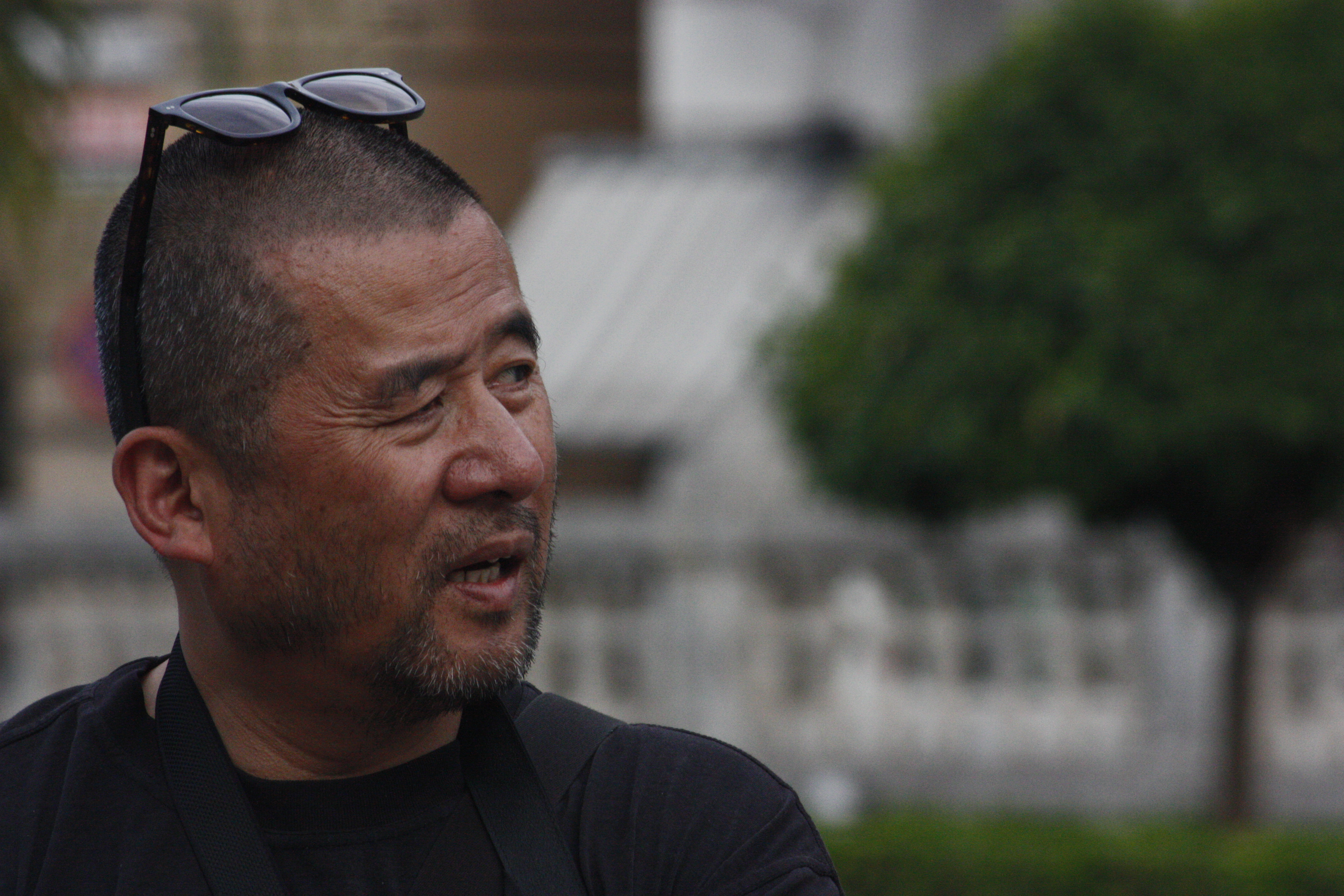
Artist Zhang Peili

Zhang Peili (born 1957) is a Chinese contemporary artist. Considered the father of video art in China he works mainly with installation and video.

== Biography ==
Zhang Peili was born in Hangzhou, China, in November 1957. He attended the Zhejiang Academy of Fine Arts (now the China Academy of Art) and graduated from the Department of Oil Painting in 1984. In 1986, Zhang and fellow artists Geng Jianyi and Song Li founded the Pond Society, an artist collective that became known for its existential bent and its interest in separating art and emotion and organising public happenings and interventions in Hangzhou. He currently lives and works in Hangzhou, as the dean of the New Media Department of the China Academy of Arts.

His major works include 'X?’ series (1986–1987), 30X30 (1989), Water: Standard Version from Cihai Dictionary (1991), Document on Hygiene No.3 (1991), Last Words (2003) and A Gust of Wind (2008). Zhang is mainly engaged in works with the media in video, text, sound installation, mechanical installation and photography, along with art education.

== Artistry ==
After experimenting with oil painting, public installations, and street art, Zhang Peili turned almost completely to video art. His earliest video works experiment with the aesthetics of boredom, and themes of social and political control. He interacted almost directly with the parallel narratives of video art found in the United States and France. Zhang's work is always in some way political, having become infamous for his use of irony that consistently mocks without descending into satire.

Recent works of Zhang Peili is interrogative of conventions of viewing, the perception of time, and the notions of progress via the remixing and editing of found footage. He also attempts to challenge the boundaries of media art, focusing on complex video installations for the previous ten years.

=== Experimental videography ===
Zhang Peili's early video works are often formally experimental and conceptually confrontational. For example, his 30x30 (1988) – possibly the first piece of video art produced in China – shows him continuously smashing a mirror and gluing it back together. The work was screened at the Huangshan Conference of 1988, which led to the historic China/Avant-Garde exhibition at the National Art Museum of China (then the National Art Gallery) in Beijing in 1989, where Zhang had to fast-forward it because members of the audience complained about its slow pace.

Zhang responds to the rising popularity of mass entertainment and home television, employing an aesthetic of boredom to challenge mass media viewing conventions and mock the social consequences of popular television. Furthermore, it reflects a backlash against the narcissism and passive spectatorship of the era. It is an approach to history and politics through a bleak lens, demonstrating meaningless destruction and reconstruction.

In his 1991 Document on Hygiene No. 3, similar themes, particularly of repetition, are addressed, wherein he continuously washes a chicken with a bar of soap. It shows a frustration with political control and sets a standard for Chinese video art, showing how the presence of a camera can transform the recorded object.

=== Found footage ===
Detail from Continuous Reproduction (1993) at the Hirshhorn Museum and Sculpture Garden in 2022

Zhang Peili's 2002 video Actor's Lines is composed of edited and remixed footage appropriated from a 1964 state-sanctioned film. Zhang transforms the dialogue from one of patriotic love to one that suggests there might be a romantic relationship between the older comrade and the young soldier. Zhang locates the site of power in interpersonal relationships and relays a moment of slippage, where a relationship that ought to be hierarchal is transformed into one that could be reciprocal and horizontal, threatening the apparatus of military power that initially created the initial relational matrix.

In the 2004 dual-channel parallel projection video installation Go Ahead, Go Ahead, Zhang shows clips of American and Chinese war films simultaneously to reject the violence of war by exposing its absurdity, opposed to searching for common ground between the two narratives. It is existential, nihilistically abandoning national ties and turning to human violence as a concept not justified by its filmic content.

The 2006 video Happiness shows an edited classic Cultural Revolution-era film, first released in 1970. Zhang focuses on a single scene in which an overzealous crowd irrationally applauds a speaker. He edits both the audio and video tracks to present the crowd as not actually responding to the speaker, rather overcome with emotion and descended into a mindless frenzy. Zhang is exploring reception theory in mass media, collective crowd action, and visual effect.

=== Emotion and recognition ===
The 1996 multi-channel video installation Uncertain Pleasure simultaneously shows 10 different views of a man scratching himself, images haunted by a vague eroticism and sense of voyeurism or surveillance. This forces the viewer to both question social uses of video communication and seek a new definition of mediated pleasure.

The 2005 work The Lowest Resolution takes footage from a sexual instruction video intended for newly-wed couples and freely available, repositioned in an installation where the resolution reduces the closer the viewer gets to the video feed. Zhang questions how video, technical manipulation, and video mediation alter reality, focusing on the interplay between affect and understanding.

== Exhibited works ==
Zhang Peili has participated in the Venice Biennale three times. His works have been shown in several important international show such as Lyon Biennale, Sydney Biennale, Gwangju Biennale, and more.

He has held solo exhibitions at the Museum of Modern Art New York (MoMA). His works have also been collected for permanent collections by prominent institutions such as the Museum of Modern Art New York, the Guggenheim Museum and the Centre Georges Pompidou.
