= Yue Minjun =

Chinese artist

- 岳敏君
- Born: 1962 (age 63–64); Daqing, Heilongjiang, China
- Education: Hebei Normal University, Oil Painting
- Known for: Painting, Installation art, Sculpting
- Notable work: Execution, Backyard Garden, Hats
- Movement: Cynical Realism

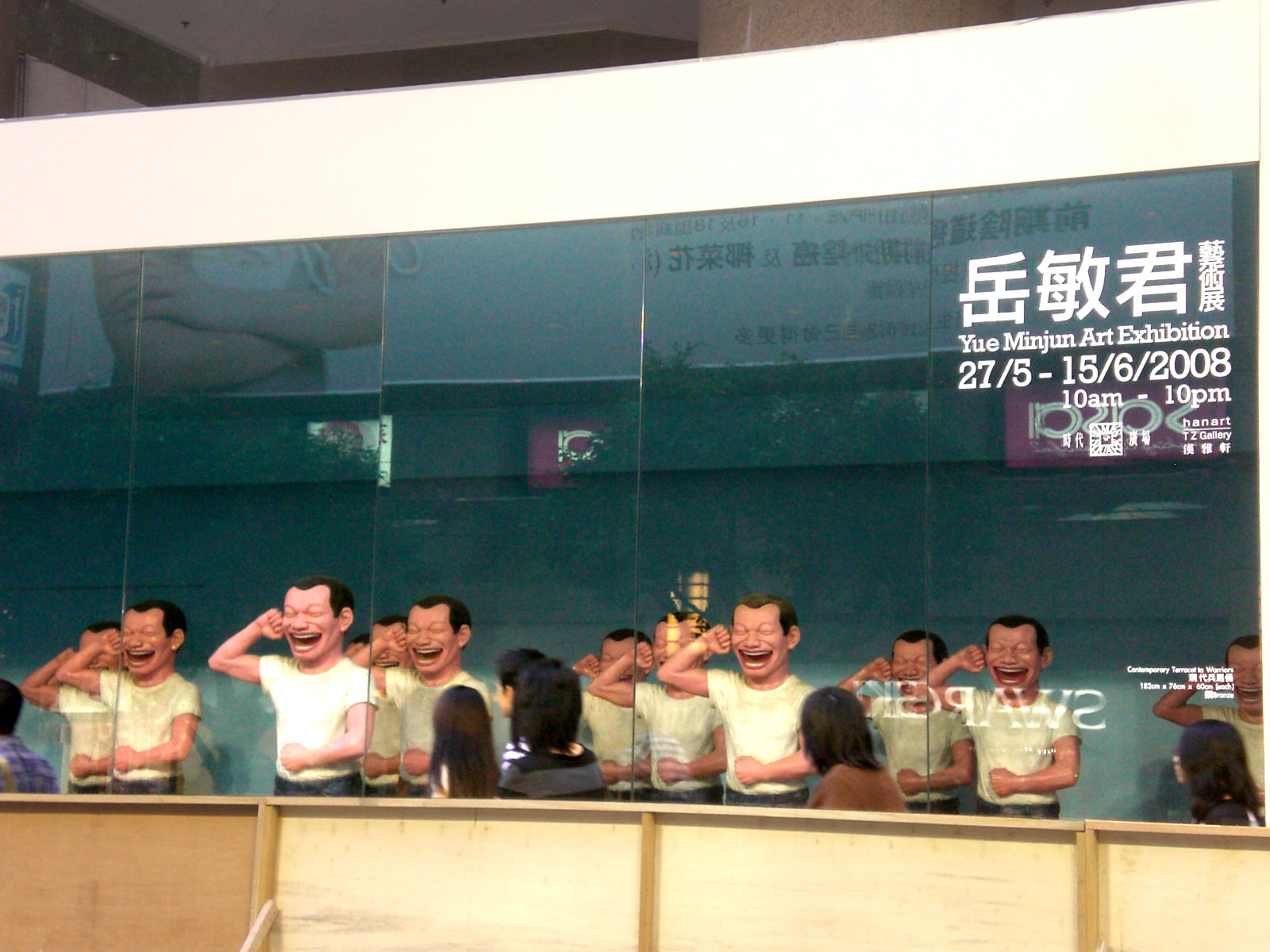
Yue Minjun Art Exhibition. Times Square, Hong Kong, 2008

Yue Minjun (Chinese: 岳敏君; born 1962) is a Chinese contemporary artist based in Beijing, China. He is best known for oil paintings depicting himself in various settings, frozen in laughter. He has also reproduced this signature image in sculpture, watercolour and prints. While Yue is often classified as part of the Chinese Cynical Realist art movement developed in 1989, Yue rejects this label, but also "doesn't concern himself about what people call him."

== Early life ==
Yue was born in 1962 in Daqing, Heilongjiang, China. His family worked on an oil field, and he also taught art in oil school for a short time. In 1980, he graduated from high school, went to Tian Jing National Company. In 1983, he decided to go to Hebei and became an electrician. He was painting and working at the same time, and he could normally paint and work non-stop for 20 days. This life experience could indicate why he paints skin in red. In the 1980s, he started painting portraits of his co-workers and the sea while he was engaged in deep-sea oil drilling. In 1989, he was inspired by a painting by Geng Jianyi at an art show in Beijing, which depicted Geng's own laughing face. In 1990, he eventually moved to Hongmiao in the Chaoyang District, Beijing, which was also home to many other Chinese artists. During this period, his style of art developed out of portraits of his bohemian friends from the artists' village. Yue lived a "nomadic" existence for much of his life, because his family often moved in order to find work on various oil fields. Labeled by critics as a very influential member of the Cynical Realism movement, he found success and praise for his signature images in a variety of including sculpture, water color, and print.

== Career ==
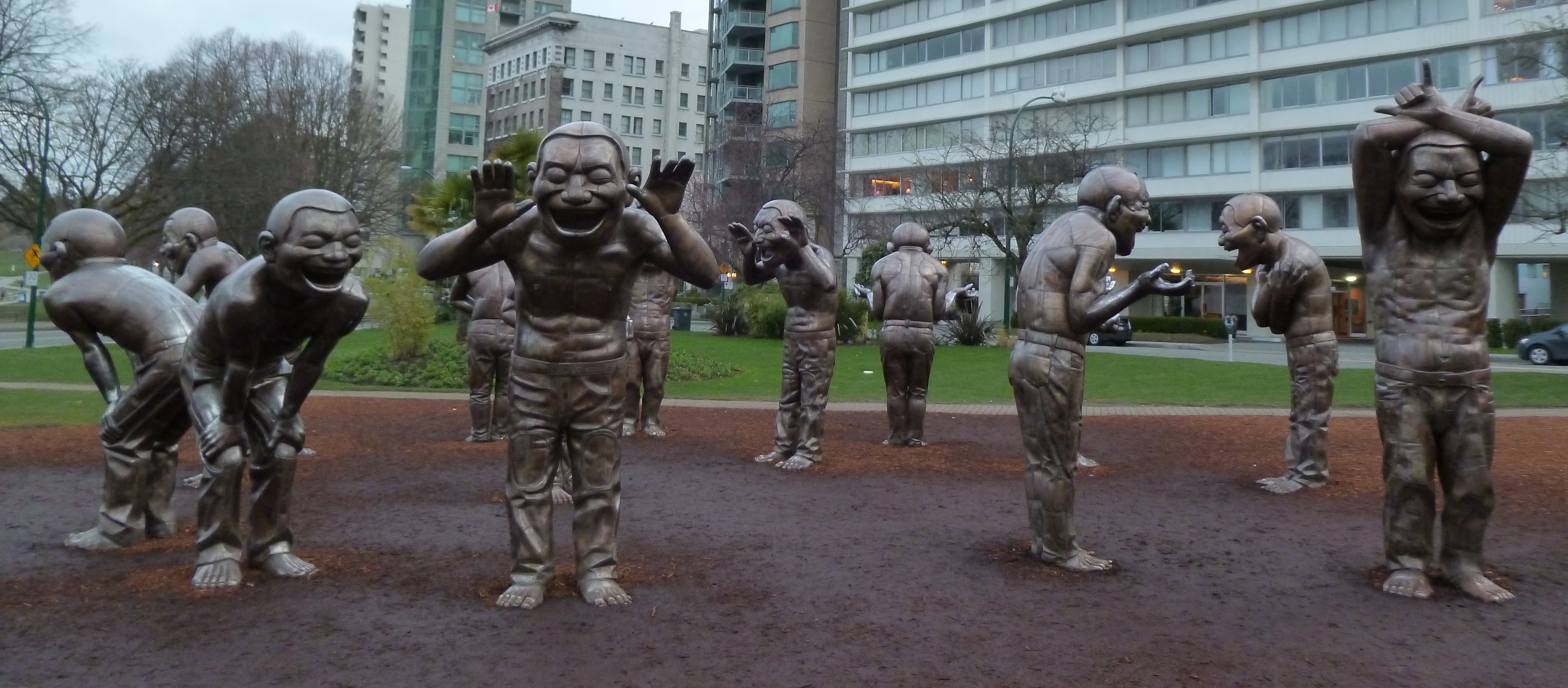
A-maze-ing Laughter by Yue Minjun in Vancouver

Yue Minjun's style can be traced back to the work of Geng Jianyi, who first inspired Yue with his work of his own laughing face. Over the years, Yue Minjun's style has also rapidly developed. He often challenges social and cultural conventions by depicting objects and even political issues in a radical and abstract manner. He has also shifted his focus from the technical aspects to the "whole concept of creation". 'Massacre of Chios', one of his most known works, shares its name with a painting of the same name, by Eugène Delacroix, depicting the 1822 event in Greek history. As of 2007 thirteen of his paintings had sold for over a million dollars. One of his most popular series was his "Hat" collection. This series, pictures Yue's grinning head wearing a variety of hats—a chef's hat, a Special Forces beret, the helmet of a British policeman, Catwoman's mask, and so on. The artist tells us that the series is about a "sense of the absurdity of the ideas that govern the sociopolitical protocol surrounding hats." The series nicely illustrates the way that Yue's character is universally adaptable, a sort of logo that can be attached to any setting to add value. When asked to participate in the Venice Biennale in 1999, Yue opted to begin fabricating bronze sculptural versions of his signature self-portrait paintings, playing off China's famous Qin Dynasty army of terracotta warriors.

Yue's 1997 painting Founding Ceremony is an commentary on Dong Xiwen's famous painting The Founding Ceremony of the Nation. Dong's painting depicts figures present at the 1949 proclamation of the People's Republic of China and was revised multiple times subsequently based on internal conflicts in the Chinese Communist Party. Yue's ironic version of the piece depicts the famous scene without any people in it.

== Cynical Realism ==
In the mid-1990s, the "godfather" of Chinese contemporary art, Li Xianting, labeled Yue Minjun with Cynical Realism. Cynical Realism described the status of living with a cynical and ridiculing art attitude, using self-opinion to understand the political and commercial. "Yue's pieces are mocking himself and the community, free himself and vent his emotions."

== Art market ==
Since his debut, the work of Yue Minjun has been featured in numerous galleries in Singapore, Hong Kong and Beijing. His piece Execution became the most expensive work ever by a Chinese contemporary artist, when sold in 2007 for £2.9 million pounds (US $5.9 million) at London's Sotheby's. Until its sale at Sotheby's Hong Kong in 2007, this painting had been owned by Trevor Simon, a junior investment banker who bought it with about a third of his salary while working in the region. Simon kept this painting in storage for 10 years as required by the conditions of sale. The record sale took place week after his painting Massacre of Chios sold at the Hong Kong Sotheby's for nearly $4.1 million.

== Exhibitions ==
During the "Year of China" in France in 2003/2004, he participated to the exhibition "China, the body everywhere?" including 39 Chinese contemporary artists such as Zhang Xiaogang, Wang Guangyi, Fang Lijun, Yang Shaobin at the Museum of Contemporary Art of Marseille.

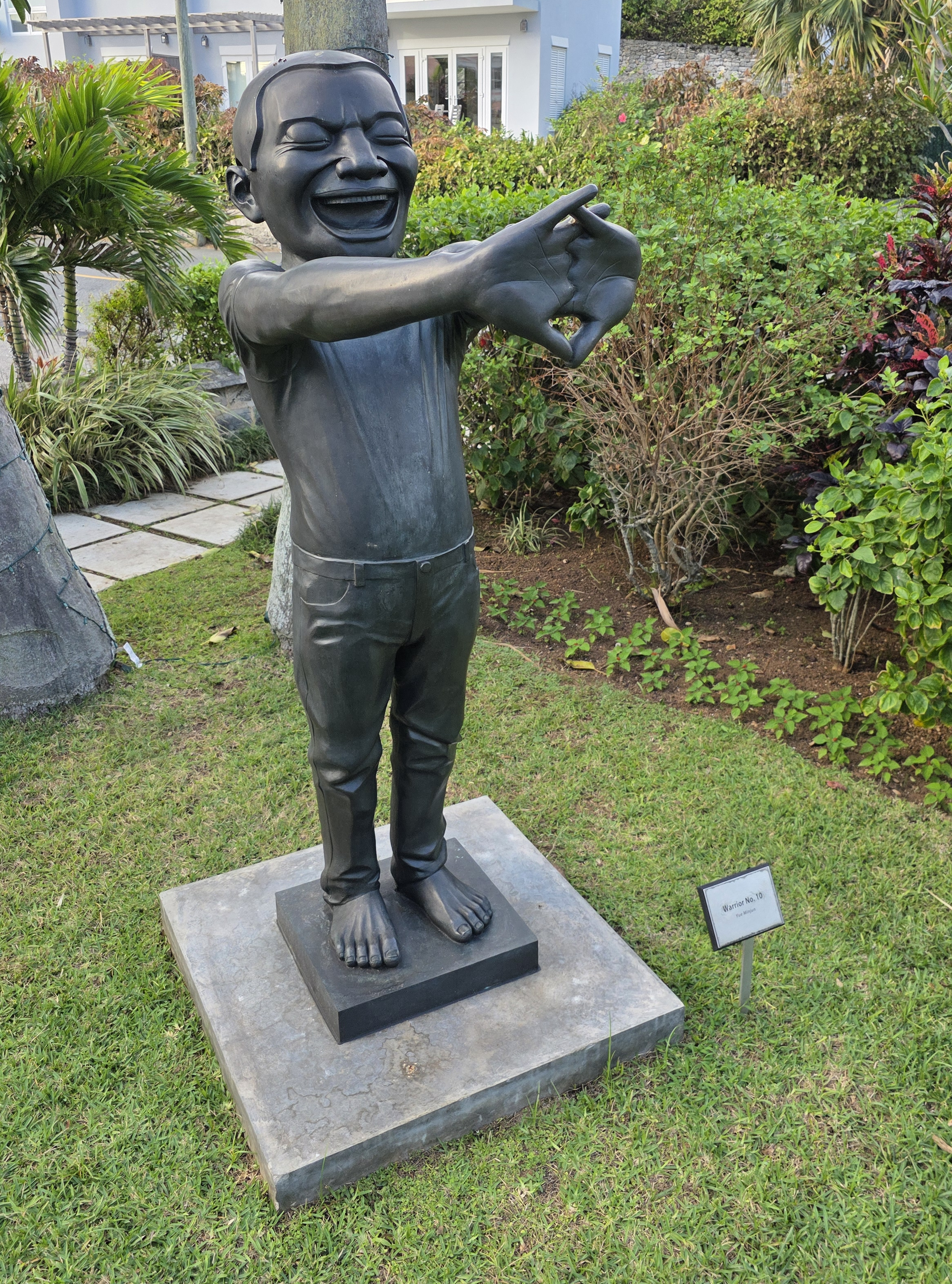
Warrior No. 10 by Yue Minjun in the Hamilton Princess in Bermuda

Kunsthalle Mannheim under director Rolf Lauter already integrated works by Yue Minjun, Fang Lijun and Yang Shaobin in his first new presentations 2003/2004 of the new collection. The constellations with 19th century portraits - Maillol and Rodin - as well as works by Jeff Wall and Alex Katz found a critical and broad response in Germany at the time.

Yue Minjun's first museum show in the United States took place at the Queens Museum of Art, Queens, New York. The show, Yue Minjun and the Symbolic Smile, featured bronze and polychrome sculptures, paintings and drawings and ran from October 2007 to January 2008.

== See also ==
- A-maze-ing Laughter
