= Execution (painting) =

Painting by Beijing artist Yue Minjun

- Artist: Yue Minjun
- Year: 1995
- Type: Oil painting
- Dimensions: 150 cm × 300 cm (59.1 in × 118.1 in)

Execution is a 1995 oil painting by Chinese artist Yue Minjun. The piece was inspired by the 1989 Tiananmen Square protests and massacre, although the artist stated that the piece should not be viewed as depicting what happened at Tiananmen Square. In 2007 it became the most expensive work sold by a Chinese contemporary artist.

== Overview ==
Yue Minjun painted Execution in 1995 in a month. He sold the painting to Hong Kong art dealer Manfred Schoeni for $5,000. Trevor Simon, an investment banker, stumbled across the painting in 1996 in the back of a Hong Kong gallery. He convinced Schoeni to sell the piece for HK$250,000 / US$32,200. The painting was then shipped from Hong Kong to London, where Simon stored it in a warehouse. Under the terms, the painting was to remain out of sight for five years in a warehouse.

In 2007, Execution became the most expensive work of Chinese contemporary art, selling for £2.9 million / US$5.9 million / €4.2 million at London's Sotheby's. The art piece was billed by Sotheby's as "Among the most historically important paintings of the Chinese avant-garde ever to appear at auction." Simon called Yue a brave man for painting something so politically dangerous.

The artist Yue Minjun denies that his paintings are a veiled criticism of his government or of Chinese society, and he does not believe his work will bring him trouble.

I want the audience not to think of one thing or one place or one event. The whole world's the background. As I said, the viewer should not link this painting to Tiananmen. But Tiananmen is the catalyst for conceiving of this painting.

The painting has been compared to Goya's The Third of May 1808 and Manet's The Execution of Emperor Maximilian.
