= Liu Wei (artist) =

Chinese artist based in Beijing (born 1972)

- Born: 1972 (age 53–54); Beijing, China
- Education: China Academy of Art
- Known for: performances, paintings, installations, video, photography
- Movement: Conceptual Art

Liu Wei (Chinese: 刘韡; born 1972 in Beijing) is a Chinese artist based in Beijing. He works in varied media – video, installation, drawing, sculpture, and painting – with no uniting stylistic tendency, though the Saatchi Gallery finds a uniting theme of "a sentiment of excess, corruption, and aggression reflective of cultural anxiety". Conceptualism, satire, and humor are the hallmarks of his works.

His works include the Super Structure series of model cityscapes constructed from dog chews; the Purple Air oil paintings of stylised skyscraper cityscapes; the Landscape Series of landscapes made from photographic composites of human buttocks; and Indigestion II, a two-metre model turd.

He has shown work in exhibitions including 21: World Wide Video Festival in Amsterdam, Cinema du Reel at the Pompidou Centre in France, Over One Billion Served at the Museum of Contemporary Art in Denver, and Between Past and Future at the International Center for Photography in New York City. His dog chew structures were in 2010 once again shown during the exhibition Dreamlands at the Centre Pompidou in Paris. On October 21, 2025, the Metropolitan Museum of Art announced that Liu had been chosen for the 2026 Genesis Facade Commission; it will be on display September 17, 2026, through June 8, 2027.

== Early career ==
Liu graduated from China Academy of Art in Hangzhou in 1996. He stated that he "really began doing art after [he] graduated in 1996." Between 1996 and 1998, he experienced a post-graduate period of transition in which he was producing idealistic oil paintings. In 1998 and 1999, he also began producing installation works as well as video projects. The majority of these video projects were related to the human body. He described these works as impulsive and intuitive: works of a still young and impulsive artist.

After graduation, he returned to Beijing, where he turned from painting to experiments in other types of media, such as videography. He participated in several DIY exhibitions while supporting himself as an editor at Beijing Youth Daily. In 1999, he was involved with a group of subversive artists known as the "Post-Sense Sensibility" group and participated in an exhibit known as "Post-Sense, Sensibility, Alienated Bodies, and Delusion". Then in 2003, he was invited by Hou Hanru to participate in the Fifth Shenzhen International Public Art Exhibition, which was to be called "The Fifth System: Public Art in the Age of Post-planning". Before, Liu Wei had only worked collaboratively with other student artists. This was his first opportunity to create a solo project with an internationally known curator. At the exhibition, he initially meant to procure and transport an airplane boarding bridge to the exhibition site. However, the endeavor was too expensive and too ambitious and never came to pass. This was his first encounter with "system" and its ability to impede on his work. He has cited the mishap as a turning point in his artistic career towards a more pragmatic approach. By 2006, Liu Wei began producing the kinds of works that would characterize his art for the next decade: art concerned with objects of daily life and the systems that govern everyday existence.

=== "Post-Sense Sensibility" group ===
Liu began his career as a member of the subversive movement known as Post-Sense Sensibility. Art trends that had been popular in the early 1990s, such as political pop and cynical realism, seemed outdated and ineffective to many of the younger generation artists. Later in the 1990s, new art forms such as installation, performance art, video art, and conceptual photography were widely embraced and were used to demonstrate conceptual art that came to dominate contemporary Chinese art. The 1999 show "Post-sense, Sensibility, Alien Bodies and Delusion" in Shaoyaoju, Beijing, was one that included artists from all over China, notorious for visceral sculptures of human and animal corpses, "borrowed" cadavers juxtaposed with stillborn fetus, severed human arms hanging from meat hooks, and the sounds of a goose, starving to death with its feet glued to the floor. The purpose of the exhibition was to create art that would not be collected by Western audiences, which reveals the extent of resentment against Western powers. The young generation of artists accused foreign collectors of "plotting to control Chinese art." The Post-Sense Sensibility artists had a shared distaste for the political idealism and rationality of their predecessors. They embraced irrationality, improvisation, intuition, and aimed create extreme experiences. Their shows were held in makeshift venues between 1999 and 2003, and in an effort to have spontaneous context-specific responses, their exhibitions were premised on self-imposed rules that each artist reacted to individually at the exhibition site. Since China's entry into the World Trade Organization, the artists have become more tolerant of Western collectors. Liu Wei's contribution to the 1999 exhibition was a multichannel video called Hard to Restrain. In the video, naked human figures scurry around "like insects under a spotlight".

== Themes and motifs in art ==
=== The city ===
A particular constellation of ideas have been circulating within Liu Wei's artwork since 2006. First, Liu has used urban architecture and city landscapes in many of his works, such as Love it! Bite it! or Purple Air, and Outcast. His works present ideas of corruption, alienation, or the immense verticality of a megalopolis’s infrastructure. About the influence of the city on his art, Liu Wei has said, “Cities are reality; all of China is a city under construction, and of course this influences me.” He also has acknowledged that the reality of the city is powerful and that we “feel numbed most of the time.” Liu Wei's city is ahistorical. It shows mindless material changing, decay, demolition, and construction. Thus, people are subjected to a constantly changing environment and an overwhelmingly perpetual present. In Liu Wei's city, a person can no longer organize his or her experiences based on a historical narrative. One can only live in the chaotic present.

=== The everyday ===
Liu Wei has produced artworks consisting of everyday “readymade” materials. Art series such as Anti-Matter (2006) and As Long as I See It (2006) are composed of household objects like washing machines, exhaust fans, and televisions, many of which have been altered, cut out, or “blown apart” by some unspeakable force. These works speak to the mass production and consumerism of modern society, using objects that represent the luxury of contemporary capitalist society. His use of everyday household objects and “readymades” also suggests a reinvestment in materials. The works demand that, even as new technologies and machines produce new and more ephemeral types of knowledge, humans acknowledge the forms of the everyday objects.

== Artistic process ==
At Liu Wei's studio in Beijing, little of the artwork is performed by the artist. In 2006, Liu began hiring nearby villagers to assist with the artworks and the number of workers in his studio has continued multiplying. All of his artworks are now produced by teams of assistants and fabricators. Even Liu's representational paintings are digitally generated by the artist and then transferred to a canvas, where they are filled in by studio workers.

However, despite Liu Wei's studio work, he has chosen to stop short of mechanizing his artwork, apparently preferring the slight imperfections that come from human hands. He instructs his assistants step by step, and as the assistant performs the instruction, Liu Wei watches and determines the next instruction accordingly; allowing for some improvisation to enter into the work. In sculpture, Liu Wei asserts even less control, which are put together in sections by workers who follow short verbal instructions.

His artworks and installations are produced through a process of tinkering as workers add and manipulate the forms in a theatrical experience. He often revisits sculptures and installations, making significant alterations later on. His artworks are constantly in flux, morphing and changing, like any other form of matter.

== Artistic style ==
In an interview from 2010, Liu Wei was asked, "How would you define your work?" to which he replied, "I couldn't. There's no way to define it."

Rather than beginning with a material or a technique, Liu Wei brings his artistic endeavors with ideas and then considers how best to express them. When he becomes comfortable and "fluent" with a particular type of work and no longer finds any obstacles or problems within that material type and the style it achieves, he changes his materials and styles.

Yet Lui Wei readily admits that there is no way to completely "kill" the idea of style. "Actually, there is always still something beneath," he has said, "But I could never use some surface things – for example, the way lots of artists use a representative form, almost like a symbol or emblem – as a way to define my work, or to prove that I had a style of position." Liu Wei suggested that, much like physics, "when a structure is at rest, it no longer has any energy, but when the structure is broken, and its parts begin to move around again, it is filled with energy, power, and vitality." It is through continually moving from one style and material to another that Liu Wei perceives his artwork as maintaining interest.

== Selected artworks ==
=== Looks Like a Landscape (2004) ===
Digital B/W Photograph 304.8 x 121.9 cm

Looks Like a Landscape is a black and white photograph of upturned male buttocks meant to resemble a Chinese mountain landscape.

The photograph was entered and accepted in the Shanghai Biennale after organizers of the exhibition requested he make adjustments to his original submission idea, a train car on a rotating turntable. Rather than accommodate the wishes of the organizers, Wei submitted Looks Like a Landscape. In his description of the work Liu Wei has said "I was really angry, really angry, so I decided to show them an ass." Despite the subject matter, the organizers of the Shanghai Biennale were pleased with the traditional Chinese tone of the work and accepted it into the exhibition.

After the Biennale, Liu Wei became a known figure in the world of contemporary Chinese art. In an interview with Barbara Pollack, Wei attributes his initial career success to Looks Like a Landscape. In the interview Wei said "This photograph changed my life and made it possible for me to live off my work".

=== Indigestion II (2004) ===
Mixed Media 83 x 214 x 89 cm

Indigestion is meters-high pile of excrement made of tar, one of the petrochemical industry's residual products.

In his description of the work, Liu Wei has said "The idea behind the work originates from a picture of a giant that has gobbled up everything that crossed his path and who has excreted it all again just before the visitor passes by. If you take a good look at the excrement, it turns out that not everything he so greedily swallowed was digestible. The indigestible leftovers compose a miniature war scene." On closer inspection, one can see that the indigestible "kernels" of the excrement are actually hundreds of toy soldiers, airplanes, and instruments of war.

A comic overstatement, Liu's enormous pile of excrement is a statement of rejection. Typically, a gigantic pile of excrement might serve as a monument of people who are eating well. Yet the war technology and instruments suggest that society is not properly digesting the new technology that has created. Humans think that problems can be solved quickly, through faster and more innovative technology. But in reality, fast "digestion" only creates more problems and misunderstandings; more indigestion. The work most certainly concerns itself with themes of consumerism, consumption, technology. There also exists a connection between this work and the current global conflict over energy resources.

=== Love it! Bite it! (2006) ===
Edible Dog Chews Dimensions variable

Love it! Bite it! is an urban city scene of miniature buildings composed from pieces of dried gut, the type sold in pet shops for dogs to chew on.

At the time it was revealed to the public, Liu Wei was surprised by the reaction. The viewers were meant to notice immediately that these buildings were parliament buildings; symbols of power. Instead, they focused on the aesthetic "beauty" of the buildings, even though Liu Wei had deliberately had his studio produce the tiny buildings in a "slipshod" way.

Liu intended the artwork to show the connection between the material used to construct the buildings and power itself. The comparison he was hoping his audience would make has to do with the human will to power being like a dog to a bone; an animal-like reaction, commenting on the inevitable corruption of power figures.

== Selected exhibitions ==
1999

- Art for Sale, Shanghai Plaza, Shanghai, China
- Beijing in London, Institute of Contemporary Art, London
- Post-sensibility: Alien Bodies and Delusion, Shaoyaoju, Beijing, China

2000

- “Home?” Contemporary Art Project, Yuexing Furniture Warehouse, Shanghai, China

2001

- Post-Sensibility: Spree, Beijing Film Academy, Beijing, China
- Non-linear Narrative, Gallery of National Academy of Fine Arts, Hangzhou, China
- Mantic Ecstasy, Impression Gallery, Hangzhou; Bizart Art Center, Shanghai; Loft New Media Art Space, Beijing, China
- 16th Asian International Art Exhibition, Guangdong Museum of Art, Guangzhou, China

2002

- The First Guangzhou Triennial, Guangdong Museum of Art, Guangzhou, China
- Mirage, Godot Art Museum, Suzhou Art Museum, Suzhou, China
- Everyday Attitude, An Exhibition of Chinese Photo-Based Arts, Pingyao, Shanxi, China
- Too Much Flavour, 3H Art Center, Shanghai, China; Avant-garde@Hakaren, Singapore

2003

- Open sky Duolun Museum of Art Shanghai, China
- The fifth system, public art in the age of "post-planning" Shenzhen, China
- Hello, comrade Mingong, Today Museum of Art Beijing, China
- Double time, China academy of fine arts, Hangzhou
- Second hand reality, Today Museum of Art Beijing, China
- Refine 798, 798, Beijing, China

2004

- Shanghai Biennale techniques of the visible, Shanghai, China
- Exhibitions Between Past and Future: New Photography and Video from China International Center of Photography, Asia Society, New York City, United States
- Regeneration Charles Cowles Gallery, New York City, United States

2005

- 51 Venice Biennale, Venice, Italy
- Mahjong, Bern, Switzerland
- First Nanjing Triennial, Nanjing, China

2006

- The 4th Seoul International Media Art Biennale, Seoul Museum of Art, Seoul, Korea
- CHINAJAPANKOREA, Art from Japan, China and Korea, Fondazione Sandretto Re Rebaodengo

2016

- Chinese Whispers, Museum of Fine Arts Bern, Bern, Switzerland

2020

- Invisible Cities, Cleveland Museum of Art

2026-2027

- The Genesis Facade Commission: Liu Wei, Speculation, The Metropolitan Museum of Art, New York City, New York
