= Cynical realism =

Contemporary Chinese art movement

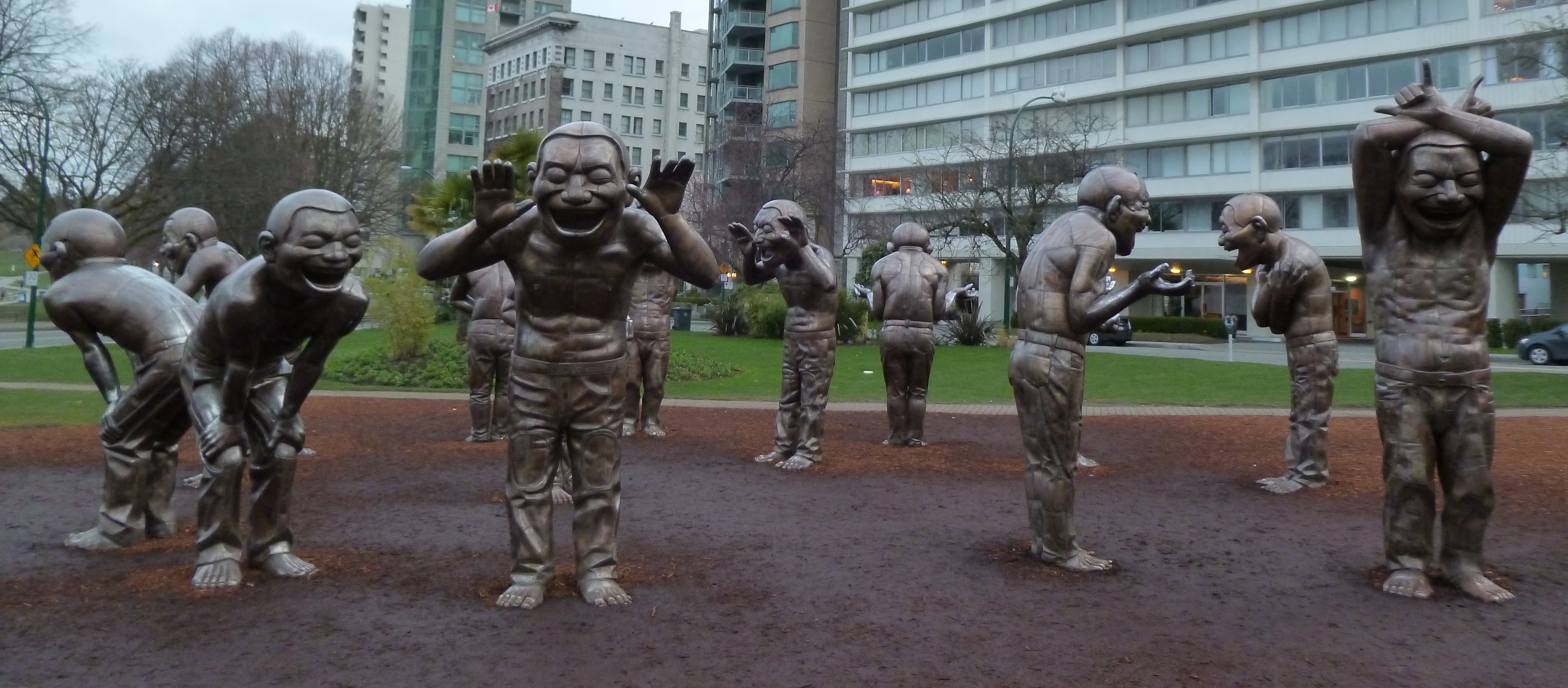
A-maze-ing Laughter by Yue Minjun

Cynical realism (simplified Chinese: 玩世现实主义; traditional Chinese: 玩世現實主義; pinyin: wánshì xiànshí zhǔyì) is a contemporary movement in Chinese art, especially in the form of painting, that began in the 1990s. The term was coined by art critic Li Xianting in 1992 in reference to satirical realist paintings aiming to depict the psychological turmoil experienced in contemporary China's political landscape.

The cynical realists of the 1990s created art that differed from the state-approved socialist realism by using humor to comment on their personal reflections of contemporary society. Cynical realist art makes use of irony, pop art, and propaganda-style visuals to satirize the Chinese government and political system. The movement is associated with Chinese dissidents and is popular among Western art markets. Artists associated with cynical realism include Fang Lijun, Liu Wei, and Yue Minjun.
