= National Art Museum of China =

- 中国美术馆
- Logo of the Museum

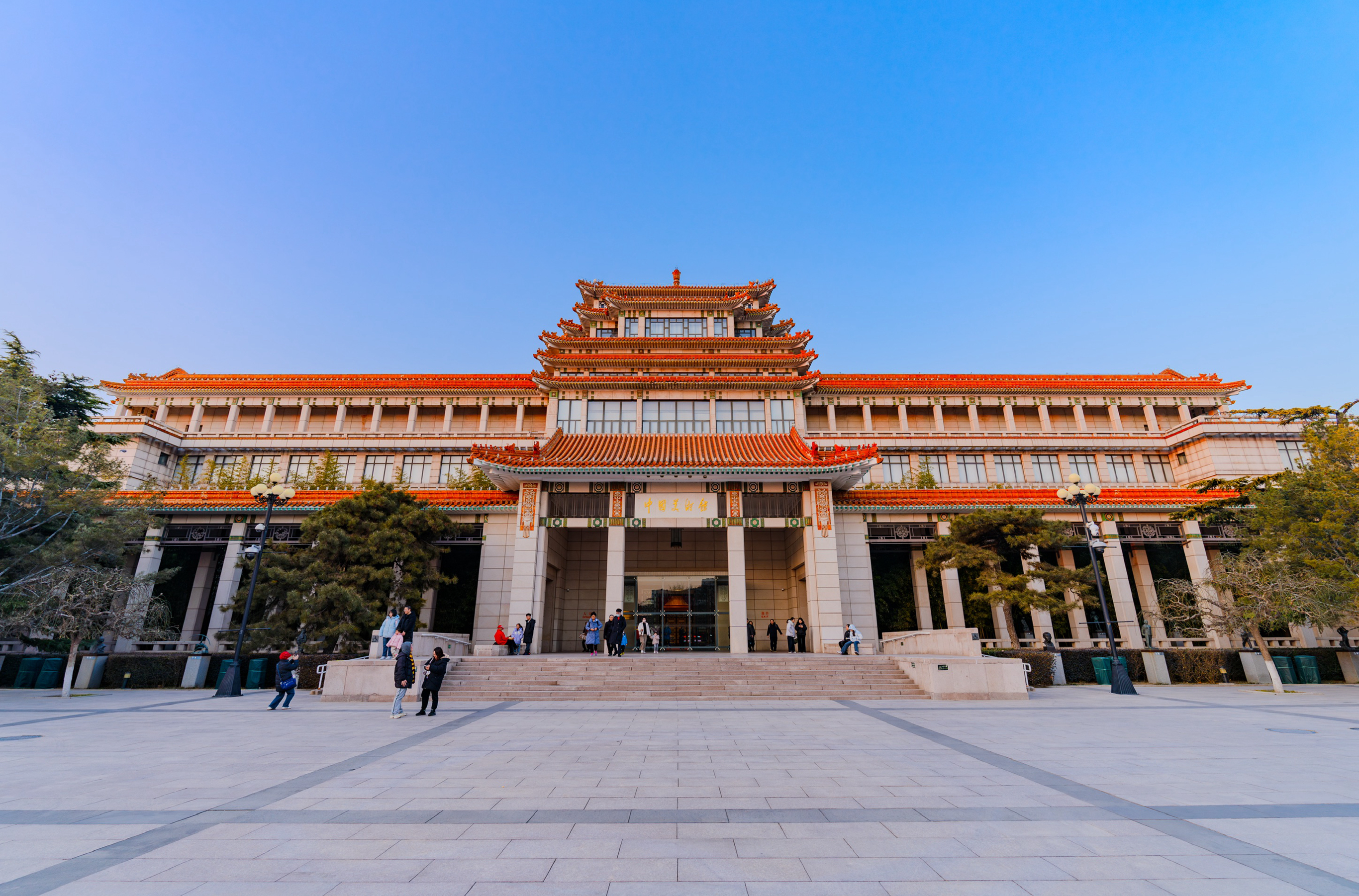
- Facade of the museum in 2025
- Established: 1958
- Location: 1 Wusi Dajie, Dongcheng District, Beijing, China
- Coordinates: 39°55′25″N 116°24′10″E
- Type: Art museum
- Collections: Ancient and contemporary Chinese art; some Western art
- Collection size: 100,000+
- Visitors: 1.05 million (2016)
- Founder: Mao Zedong
- Director: Fan Di'an
- Architect: Dai Nianci
- Owner: Ministry of Culture of the People's Republic of China
- Public transit access: 8 National Art Museum station 5 6 Dongsi station
- Parking: On site
- Website: namoc.org namoc.org/en

The National Art Museum of China (NAMOC; 中国美术馆; 'China Art Museum') is the national art museum of China and one of the largest art museums in the nation. Located in Beijing and opened since 1963, it is a level-1 public welfare institution funded by the Ministry of Culture and Tourism of China.

The construction of the museum started in 1958, and concluded in 1962. It has a total land area of 30,000 square metres (320,000 sq ft). The museum was renovated between May 2004 and January 2005, and has been given an additional area of 5,375 square metres (57,860 sq ft).

== Collection ==
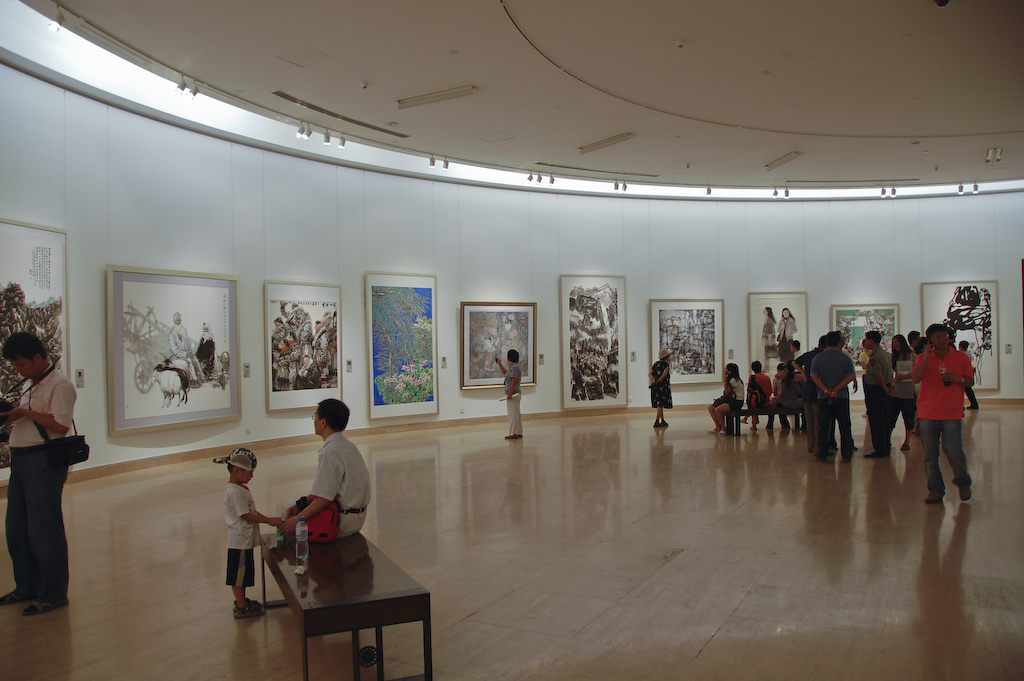
Circular Gallery inside museum

Its permanent collection includes both ancient and contemporary Chinese artworks as well as notable Western artworks. Although the museum contains collection of imperial Chinese art, its main mission is to serve as a national level art museum dedicated to displaying, collecting and researching the modern and contemporary artistic works of China. It has a main building of four stories, the first three being display areas. There are 21 exhibition halls at the museum.

Its collections are divided into specific categories of:

- traditional Chinese painting,
- oil painting,
- print,
- sculpture,
- Chinese New Year picture,
- traditional picture story,
- caricature,
- watercolor painting,
- lacquer,
- porcelain, and
- costumes

== Expansion ==
In 2012, four high-profile architects — Frank Gehry, Zaha Hadid, Jean Nouvel and Moshe Safdie — were invited to submit designs for the new National Art Museum venue, which will be seven times larger than the current venue. The museum will be built in collaboration with the Beijing Institute of Architectural Design. Nouvel's plans were revealed on September 18, 2014 at a press conference in Paris attended by the architect and Chinese and French politicians including Laurent Fabius, the French minister of foreign affairs and international development.

== Gallery ==
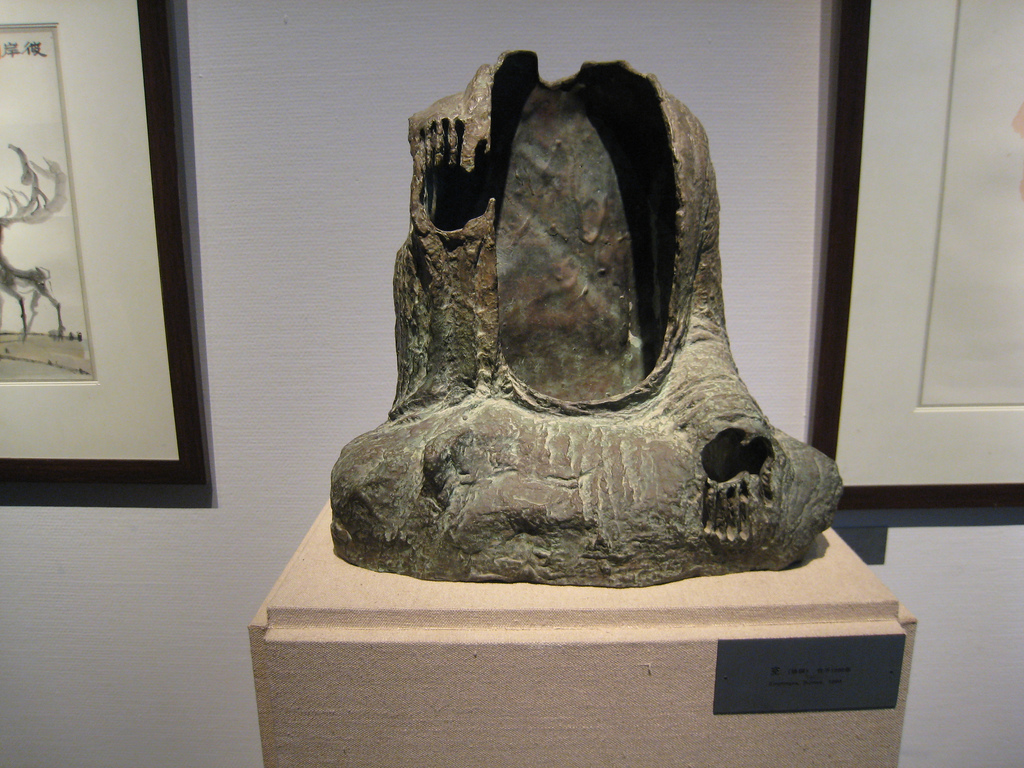

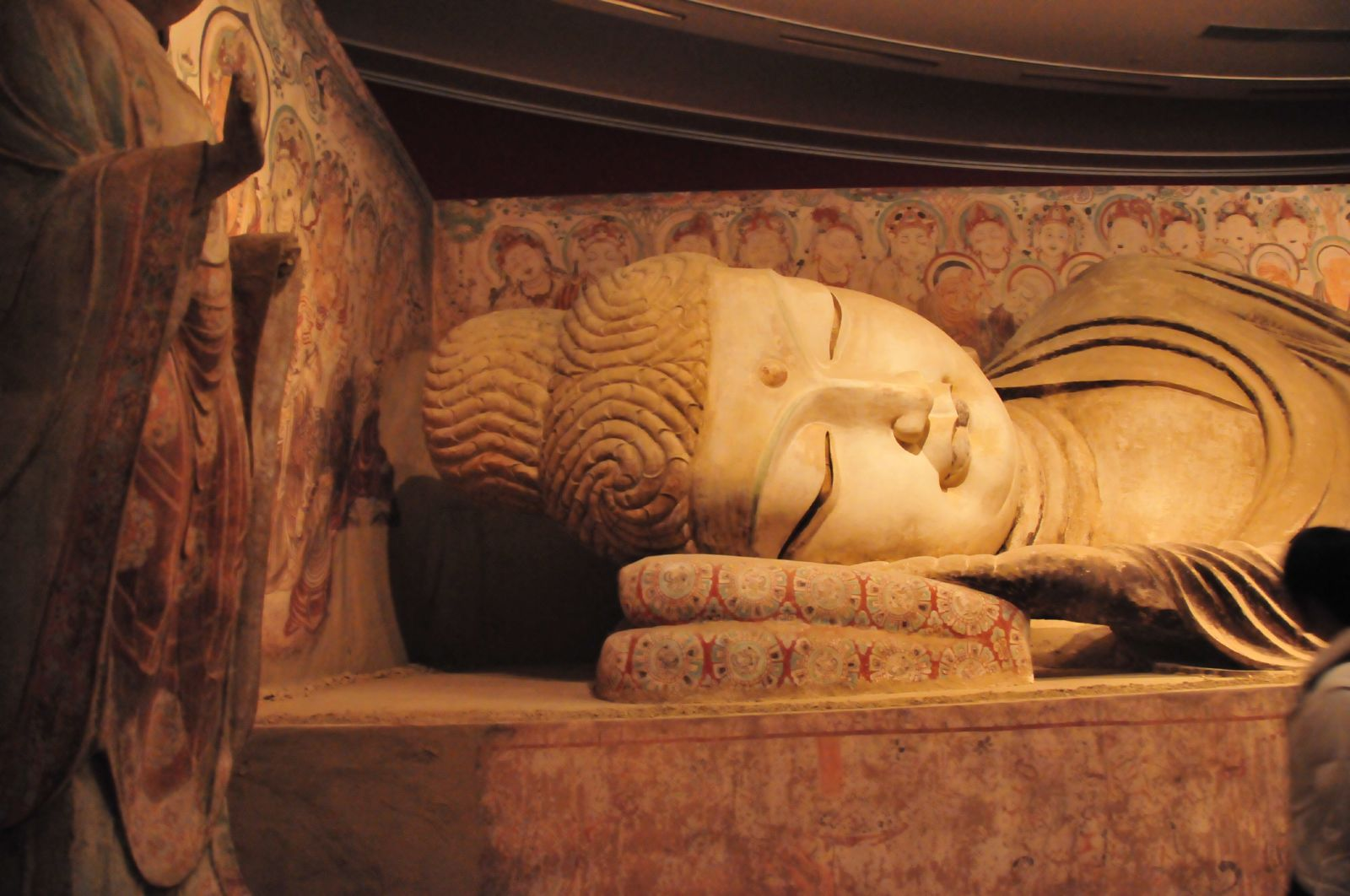

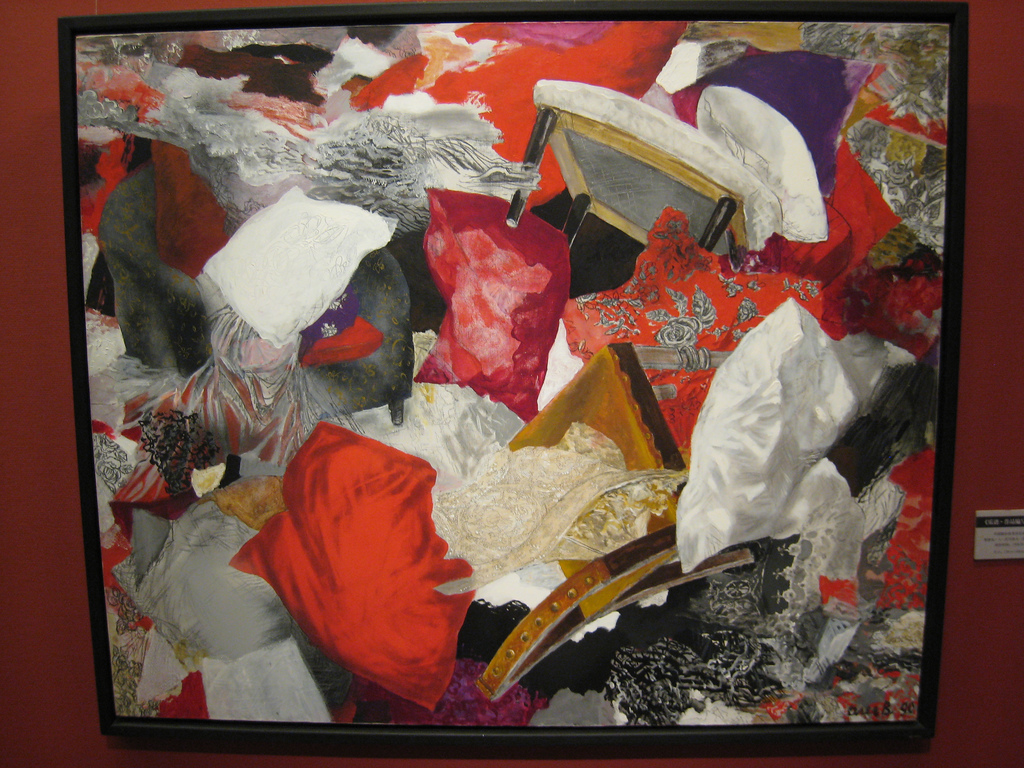

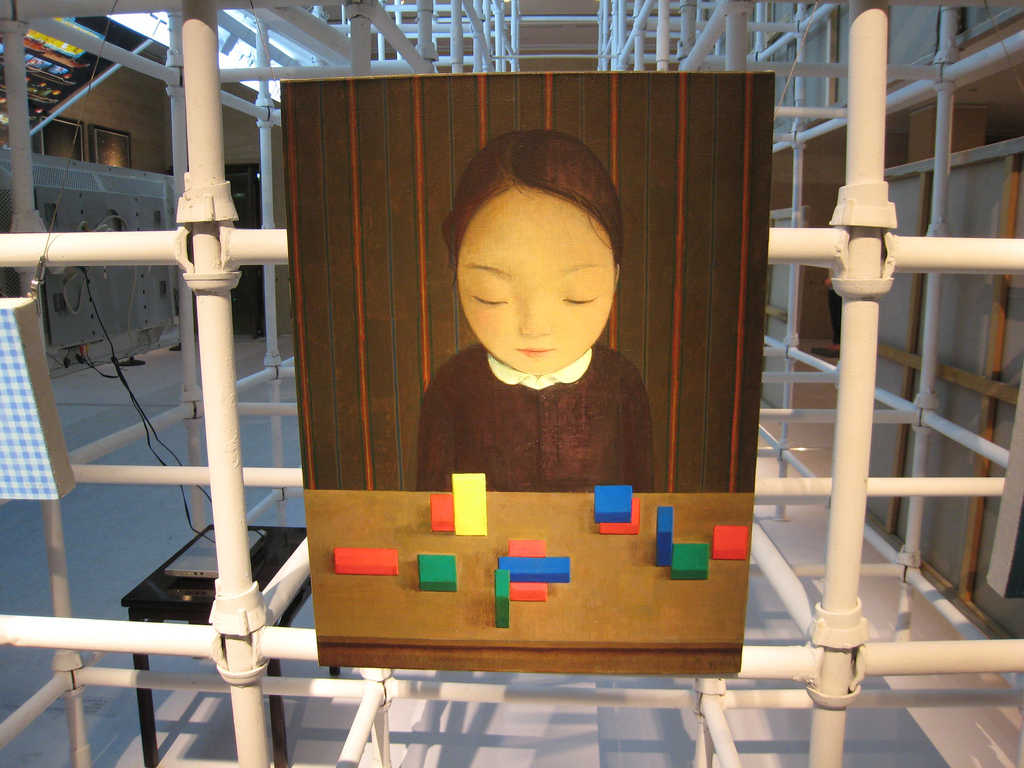

== See also ==
- List of museums in China
- List of largest art museums
