= Li Xianting =

Chinese art critic (born 1949)

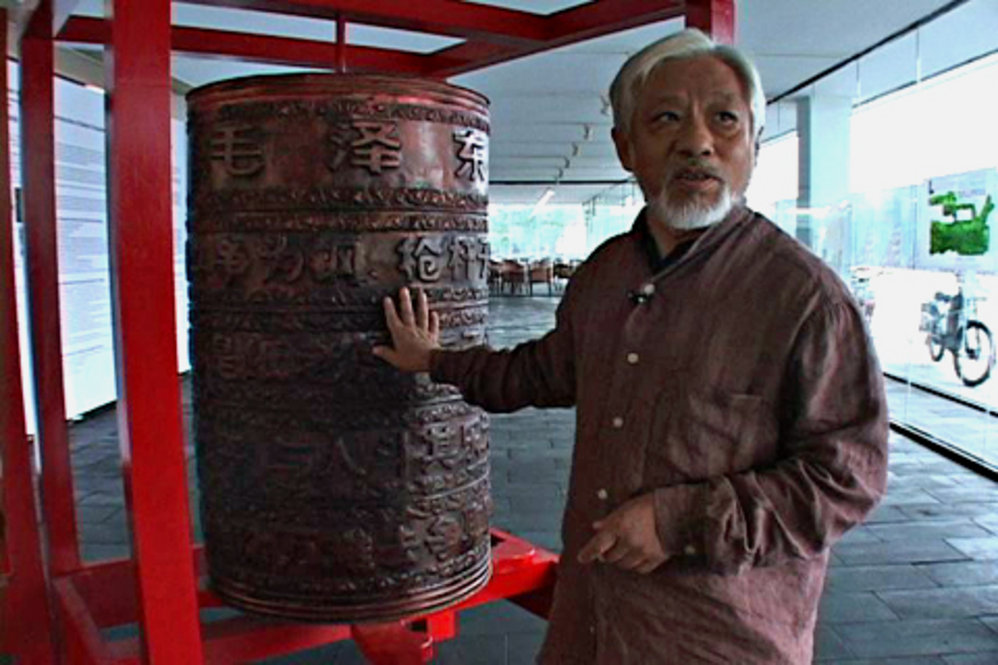
Li Xianting (Tibetan Art Exhibition, Beijing, 2010)

Li Xianting (Chinese: 栗宪庭; born 1949 in Jilin) is an independent art critic and curator of contemporary Chinese art in China. After he graduated from Chinese Painting Department, Central Academy of Fine Art in 1978, he became the editor of Fine Art Magazine until 1983. From 1985 to 1989 he was the editor of the authoritative China Fine Art Newspaper, and was active as independent critic and curator based in Beijing henceforth.

In the late seventies and eighties, Li was involved in advocating and introducing the avant-garde art form in China. He organized the "Stars exhibition" in 1979, and coined the terms "cynical realism" and "political pop". He also lectured and curated international shows, including the China Pavilion at the 45th Venice Biennale (1995). He is now the director of Songzhuang Art Museum and Li Xianting's Film Fund.
