= Inside/Out: New Chinese Art =

Contemporary art exhibition

Inside/Out: New Chinese Art was an exhibition held 15 September 1998 to 3 January 1999 held in association with Asia Society and the San Francisco Museum of Modern Art. The exhibition was presented simultaneously at Asia Society in New York and P.S.1 Contemporary Art Center (now MoMA PS1). It was curated by Gao Minglu and featured artists from mainland China, Taiwan and Hong Kong with artworks from the 1980s to 1990s.

Following its initial display in New York, the exhibition then traveled to San Francisco, where it was simultaneously presented at the San Francisco Museum of Modern Art and Asian Art Museum from 26 February 1999 to 7 March 2000. The exhibition then traveled to Museo de Art Contemporañeo in Monterrey, Mexico, Tacoma Art Museum and the Henry Art Gallery in Seattle. In 2000, the exhibition was on display at the Hong Kong Museum of Art.

== Exhibition concept ==
The exhibition is a survey of contemporary art from Chinese societies, representing artists from mainland China, Taiwan, Hong Kong, as well as those who have emigrated overseas. This was one of the first major exhibitions to present contemporary Chinese art focusing on work created between 1985 and 1998. The exhibition centers around issues of modernity, identity and transnationalism as artists created works in a region experiencing rapid and momentous changes and development.

In the exhibition catalogue, curator Gao Minglu writes "The primary goal of this exhibition is to enrich the western audience's understanding of contemporary art from selected Chinese regions, both visually and conceptually.". The exhibition was organised thematically, exploring regionally-specific topics such as the reaction to consumerism and leisure culture in China in the 1990s or the quest for cultural identity in Taiwan as well as more issues such as the tension between art and commerce, and the relationship Chinese art has with language, writing and tradition. Setting artworks in the context of social, political and historical events, the exhibition also worked to distinguish artists' places of origins, presenting a more nuanced understanding of artmaking in the different regions and cities of mainland China, Taiwan and Hong Kong.

== Participating artists ==
Over 62 artists were represented in this exhibition and 80 works created between 1985 and 1998 were on display. Participating artists included: Cai Guo-qiang, Cao Yong, Chen Hui-chiao, Chen Shun-chu, Chu Chiahua, Fang Lijun, Fang Tu, Fang Weiwen, Geng Jianyi, Wenda Gu, Ho Siu-kee, Hong Hao, Hou Chun-ming, Huang Chih-yang, Huang Yong Ping, Kum Chi-Keung, Li Shan, Shu-Min Lin, Lin Tian-miao, Liu Wei, Liu Xiangdong, Long-Tailed Elephant Group (members Lin Yilin, Chen Shaoxiong, Liang Juhui, Xu Tan), Ma Jian, Ma Liuming, Phoebe Man, Mao Xuhui, New Analysis Group (members Wang Luyan, Chen Shaoping, Gu Dexin), Pan Xing Lei, Qiu Zhijie, Ren Jian, Shu Qun, Song Dong, Song Yonghong, Song Yongping, Southern Artists Salon (Members Lin Yilin, Chen Shaoxiong, Liang Juhui), Su Xinping, Tang Song, To Weun, Tsong Pu, Wang Gonxin, Wang Guangyi, Wang Jin, Wang Jinsong, Wang Jun Jieh, Wang Peng, Wang Tiande, Wen Pulin, Wu Mali, Wu Shan Zhuan, Wu Tien-chang, Xiao Lu, Xu Bing, Yan Binghui, Yin Xiuzhen, Tim Yu, 21st Century Group (Members Sheng Qi, Kang Mu, Zhen Yuke, Zhao Jianhai), Yuan Jai, Danny Ning Tsun Yung, Zhang Huan, Zhang Peili, Zhang Xiaogang, Zhang Yu

== Reception and criticism ==
The exhibition was an important presentation of Chinese contemporary art and raised questions about non-Western art on an international stage. In Frieze, Jenny Liu wrote that although "The intentions are good, the effort and curatorial impulses admirable, ... the work, however, is too often turgid and uncritically adoptive of Western artistic frameworks". At the same time, she questioned whether contemporary art, regardless of where it is created, must address itself to an international community

There was a multitude of exhibitions on Chinese contemporary art in the 1990s and a huge interest in art created in this region, perhaps as a result of historical events piquing global interest. In 2014, Marie Martraire questioned whether exhibitions such as Inside/Out furthered an 'othering' of Chinese art rather than including it into contemporary art diaologue. She commented that a decade later, there is still a lack of content and analysis on contemporary Chinese art presented from the exhibition
