= Duan (surname) =

Duàn
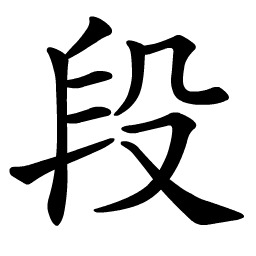
- Pronunciation: Duàn (Mandarin Pinyin); Dan (Korean); Đoàn (Vietnamese)
- Language: Chinese, Korean, Vietnamese

Origin
- Language: Old Chinese

Other names
- Derivative: Dan

Duan (Chinese: 段; pinyin: Duàn; Korean: 단; romaja: Dan; Vietnamese: Đoàn) is an East Asian surname of Chinese origin that can be found in China, Vietnam and Korea.

== Notable people ==
=== Duan ===
- Duan Aojuan (段奧娟; born 2000), Chinese singer, former member of girl group Rocket Girls 101
- Duan Chenggang (段成刚; born 1963), Chinese former politician
- Duan Chengshi (段成式; died 863), Tang Dynasty poet
- Duan Chun-hao (段鈞豪; born 1979), Taiwanese actor
- Duan Dechang (段德昌; 1904–1933), Chinese general
- Duan Dezhi (段德智; born 2001), Chinese footballer
- Duan Guangren (段广仁; born 1962), Chinese scientist
- Duan Heyu (段誉; 1083–1176), emperor of Dali Kingdom
- Duan Huiling (段慧玲; born 1970), Chinese mechanical engineer
- Duan Jianyu (段建宇; born 1970), Chinese contemporary visual artist
- Duan Jieyi (段杰毅; born 1990), Chinese footballer
- Duan Jifei (段季妃), Southern Yan Dynasty empress
- Duan Jilujuan (段疾陸眷; died 318), Jin Dynasty general
- Duan Jin (段进; born 1960), Chinese planner and professor
- Duan Jingli (段静莉; born 1989), Chinese rower
- Jinqiao Duan (段金桥; born 1962), Chinese-born mathematician
- Duan Ju (段举; born 1963), Chinese footballer
- Duan Junyi (段君毅; 1910–2004), Chinese politician
- Duan Kan (段龕; died 357), duke of Qi
- Duan Liao (段遼; died 339), Jin Dynasty general
- Duan Linxi (段林希; born 1990), Chinese singer
- Duan Liuyu (段刘愚; born 1998), Chinese footballer
- Matthias Duan Yinming (段荫明; 1908–2001), Sichuanese Roman Catholic bishop
- Naihua Duan (段乃華; born 1949), Taiwanese biostatistician
- Duan Pidi (段匹磾; died 320), Jin Dynasty general
- Duan Qifeng (段岐峰; born 1973), Chinese former track and field athlete
- Duan Qing (段晴; 1953–2022), Chinese scholar
- Duan Qingbo (段清波; 1964–2019), Chinese archaeologist
- Duan Qirui (段祺瑞; 1865–1936), former Premier of the Republic of China
- Duan Shijie (段世杰; born 1952), Chinese sports official
- Duan Shumin (段树民; born 1957), Chinese neuroscientist
- Duan Siping (段思平; 893–944), founder of Dali Kingdom
- Duan Siying (段思英; 1917–2007), Chinese politician
- Duan Sui (段隨; died 386), ruler of Western Yan Dynasty
- Duan Suying (段素英; died 1009), emperor of Dali Kingdom
- Duan Tianjie (段天杰), Chinese major general
- Duan Weihong (段伟红; born 1966), Chinese billionaire
- Duan Wenchang (段文昌; 773–835), Tang Dynasty official
- Duan Wenjie (段文杰; 1917–2011), Chinese archaeologist
- Duan Wuwuchen (段務勿塵; died 310), Jin Dynasty general
- Duan Xi (段禧; died 110), Han Dynasty general
- Duan Xiangfeng (段镶锋), Chinese researcher
- Duan Xiushi (段秀實; 719–783), Tang Dynasty general
- Duan Xuefu (段学复; 1914–2005), Chinese mathematician
- Duan Yanmo (段彥謨; died 882), Tang Dynasty general and warlord
- Duan Ye (段业; died 401), founding prince of Northern Liang Dynasty
- Duan Yihe (段义和; 1946–2007), Chinese politician and a senior lawmaker
- Duan Yihong (段奕宏; born 1973), Chinese actor
- Duan Yingying (段莹莹; born 1989), Chinese former tennis player
- Duan Yixuan (段艺璇; born 1995), Chinese singer and actress, and member of girl group SNH48
- Duan Yongping (段永平; born 1961), Chinese-American billionaire entrepreneur and electrical engineer
- Duan Yuanfei (段元妃; died 396), Later Yan Dynasty empress
- Duan Yucai (段玉裁; 1735–1815), Qing Dynasty philologist
- Duan Yunzi (段云子; born 1995), Chinese footballer
- Duan Zhengcheng (段正澄; 1934–2020), Chinese industrial engineer and inventor
- Duan Zhengchun (段正淳), emperor of Dali Kingdom
- Duan Zhengming (段正明), emperor of Dali Kingdom
- Duan Zhigui (段芝贵; 1869–1925), Chinese general
- Duan Zhixing (段智興; died 1200), emperor of Dali Kingdom
- Duan Zhixuan (段志玄; 598–642), Tang Dynasty general and officer

=== Đoàn ===
- Đoàn Thị Điểm (段氏點; 1705–1748), Vietnamese poet
- Đoàn Văn Hậu (段文厚; born 1999), Vietnamese footballer

=== Tuan ===
- Mark Tuan (段宜恩; born 1993), American rapper and singer, member of boy group GOT7
- Rocky Tuan (段崇智; born 1951), Hong Kong medical researcher and bioengineer
- Yi-Fu Tuan (段義孚; 1930–2022), Chinese-born American geographer and writer
- Tuan Yi-kang (段宜康; born 1963), Taiwanese politician

== See also ==
- Doan
- Doãn
