= Another Long March: Chinese conceptual and installation art in the nineties =

Art exhibition in the Netherlands

Another Long March: Chinese conceptual and installation art in the nineties (Chinese: 另一次長征: 九十年代中國觀念和裝置藝術）was a contemporary art exhibition held in Breda, Netherlands in 1997. It was the first big survey of conceptual art and installation art from China in the West, presenting eighteen artists from leading Chinese art centres: Beijing, Shanghai, Hangzhou and Guangzhou. The forms of the works included video art, photography, installation art and performance art. The works dealt with various themes, including the transformation of the Chinese society in the 1990s, feminism, voyeurism and nudity in art.

The exhibition was curated by Chris Driessen and Marianne Brouwer and took place at the Chassé Kazerne in Breda, Netherlands.

In curating the exhibition, Driessen and Brouwer, intended to broaden the understanding of Chinese contemporary art beyond the painting styles Cynical Realism and Political Pop, which had gained international popularity in the 1990s.

== Participating artists ==
- Chen Shaoxiong (陳劭雄)
- Chen Yanyin (陳妍音)
- Feng Mengbo (馮夢波)
- Geng Jianyi (耿建翌)
- Gu Dexin (顧德新)
- Li Yongbin (李永斌)
- Liang Juhui (梁鉅輝)
- Lin Tianmiao (林天苗)
- Lin Yilin (林一林)
- Liu Xinhua (劉新華)
- Ma Liuming (馬六明)
- Wang Jianwei (汪建偉)
- Wang Youshen (王友身)
- Xu Tan (徐坦)
- Yin Xiuzhen (尹秀珍)
- Zhang Peili (張培力)
- Zhou Tiehai (周鐵海)
- Zhu Jia (朱加)
