= Yishu Journal of Contemporary Chinese Art =

English-language Chinese art and culture journal

Yishu
- Type: Journal
- Format: Magazine
- Publisher: Art & Collection Group, Ltd.
- Editor: Keith Wallace; Shengtian Zheng
- Founded: 2002; 24 years ago
- Headquarters: Vancouver, British Columbia, Canada
- Website: www.yishujournal.com

Yishu: Journal of Contemporary Chinese Art is the first English-language journal specializing in Chinese art and culture. Each bi-monthly issue features scholarly essays on topical issues, interviews with artists and curators, conference proceedings, and critical commentary on exhibitions and books.

== Background ==
Yishu offers a platform for a wide range of voices who are living and telling the story of contemporary Chinese art from a diversity of perspectives, and who provide dialogue and debate around current visual and literary forms produced within what constitutes an expanded understanding of contemporary Chinese art.

Since its inauguration in May 2002, Yishu has raised its profile internationally to become one of the most respected journals devoted to contemporary Chinese art. Appealing to professionals in the art and academic fields, as well as art enthusiasts in general, Yishu is now the journal of record for the high quality coverage of issues and events pertinent to Chinese art today. Its high standard of critical writing by thinkers from around the world allows us to voice ideas that communicate across cultures.

Yishu is edited in Vancouver, Canada, published bi-monthly in Taipei, Taiwan, and is distributed internationally. The publishing dates are January, March, May, July, September, and November.

In 2007, the publication took part in the Documenta 12 magazines project, launched its first limited-edition print by Xu Bing, and has since offered limited-edition prints and photographs by some of today's most important Chinese artists, including Wang Guangyi, Rong Rong, and Inri. Each edition is commissioned by and entirely produced for Yishu.

In August 2010, the journal launched its archive web site. All articles published since 2002 are now available online for research and purchase.

== Editorial staff ==
- Katy Hsiu-chih Chien, President
- Ken Lum, Founding Editor
- Keith Wallace, Editor-in-Chief
- Zheng Shengtian (鄭勝天), Managing Editor
- Julie Grundvig, Editor
- Kate Steinmann, Editor
- Chunyee Li, Editor
- Lara Broyde, Subscription Manager

== Notable contributors ==
- Defne Ayas
- Colin Chinnery
- Biljana Ciric
- Jo-Anne Birnie Danzker
- Monica Dematté
- Britta Erickson
- Fan Di'an
- Gao Minglu
- Paul Gladston
- Hou Hanru
- Hu Fang
- Maya Kóvskaya
- Carol Yinghua Lu
- Victoria Lu
- Alexandra Munroe
- Hans Ulrich Obrist
- Ou Ning
- Uli Sigg
- Keith Wallace
- Zheng Shengtian

== Notable featured artists ==
- Huang Yong Ping
- Ai Weiwei
- Xu Bing
- Gao Brothers
- Yang Fudong
- Cai Guo-Qiang
- Cang Xin
- Feng Mengbo
- Li Wei
- Tsai Ming-liang
- Ching Ho Cheng
- Wang Tiande
- Gu Wenda
- Guo Wei
- Miao Xiaochun
- RongRong
- Shu Yang
- Wang Guangyi
- Wei Guangqing
- Xing Danwen
- Yam Lau
- Yan Xiaojing
- Yue Minjun
- Zhan Wang
- Zhang Dali
- Zhang Huan
- Zhang Xiaogang
- Zhu Yu
