= Canton Express =

- Traditional Chinese: 廣東快車
- Simplified Chinese: 广东快车
Transcriptions
Standard Mandarin
- Hanyu Pinyin: Guǎngdōng Kuàichē
Yue: Cantonese
- Jyutping: gwong2 dung1 faai3 ce1

Canton Express (廣東快車) was an exhibition curated by Hou Hanru in 2003. The exhibition was part of Z.O.U. — Zone of Urgency at the 50th Venice Biennale and was exhibited in the Arsenale in Venice. The exhibition contained works from four artist groups and was the first time artists from the Pearl River Delta region of China participated in a major international event. It was a reflection on the rapid industrialization and urbanization of the region throughout the 1980s and 1990s.

According to participating artist Zheng Guogu, who was also responsible for the logistics, works had to be smuggled out of China as trade shipments and the artists had to travel via Hong Kong, Thailand and France to get to Venice. This was due to the SARS outbreak which meant strict quarantine laws and travel restrictions were in place in Hong Kong and Mainland China at the time.

== Participating artist groups ==
- The Big Tail Elephant Group - Chen Shaoxiong (陳劭雄), Liang Juhui (-梁鉅輝), Lin Yilin (林一林), Xu Tan (徐坦) and Jin Jiangbo (金江波)
- Borges Libreria (博爾赫斯書店) – Chen Tong (陳侗) and Yu LI, Feng Qianyu (馮倩鈺)
- U – Theque – Duan Jianyu (段建宇), Liu Heng (劉珩), Jiang Zhi (蔣志), Yang Jiechang (楊詰蒼), Yang Yong (楊勇)
- Yangjiang Youth – Feng Qianyu (馮倩鈺), Sha Yeya (沙業亞), Zheng Guogu (鄭國谷)

== Canton Express at the M+, West Kowloon Cultural District ==
After the initial exhibition all works were purchased by Chinese collector Guan Yi who covered the cost of shipping the works back to China. In 2014 Yi donated the collection to M+, Hong Kong's museum of visual culture. Between 23.06.2017 and 10.09.2017 elements of the original Canton Express exhibition were re-staged at the M+ Pavilion, a temporary building at the West Kowloon Cultural District area in Hong Kong. The curator was Pi Li with conservation work undertaken by M+’s internal conservation team.
