= HB Station Contemporary Art Research Centre =

Chinese art institution

The HB Station Contemporary Art Research Centre (HB Station; simplified Chinese:黄边站当代艺术研究中心; traditional Chinese: 黃邊站當代藝術研究中心) is a nonprofit art institution with a focus on education and research, Run by a group of artists, writers, and curators, the institution has grown under the auspices of the Guangdong Times Museum. Based in Guangzhou, the space is considered as one of the leading alternative art educational models in China.

== History ==
HB Station was founded in 2012, after the artist Huang Xiaopeng was fired from Guangzhou Academy of Fine Arts, the art school where he taught for eight years. The Guangdong Times Museum proposed to set up a long-term independent project to continue his teaching work. Xu Tan, an artist who had taught at the academy, joined the institution as well. This project was named "Huangbianzhan Contemporary Art Research Center" and the name is still in use today. In 2017, the Times Museum ended its funding for HB Station. Since then, the HB Station have independently raised operating funds with the assistance of the “Five Guangzhou Non-profit Art Institutions Association”, a coalition formed alongside Times Museum, HB Station, CANTONBON, Video Bureau, and Observation Society.

== Team and management ==
The current work team was formed in 2016 and includes Liang Jianhua, Li Xiaotian, Feng Junhua, and Zhu Jianlin. Liang Jianhua is a Curator at the Times Museum in Guangzhou, and Project Manager of HB STATION Contemporary Art Research Center. Li Xiaotian lives and works in Guangzhou. She joined HB Station in 2012, and became the coordinator in 2016. A Co-founder and the chief editor of magazine Companion. She is an artist, also engaged in critical writing. Feng Junhua is an independent publisher and writer, currently serving as the research and publishing coordinator. Zhu Jianlin is an artist. He joined the HB Station team in 2014 and is currently coordinating the art projects.

Liang Jianhua participated in the preparation of HB Station in 2012. Li Xiaotian, Feng Junhua, and Zhu Jianlin were also among the first members recruited by HB Station in 2012. Xu Tan has been a mentor and consultant since HB Station was founded. He is an artist and a member of the Big Tail Elephant Art Group.

Although the team all have their own lives in the outside world too, the titles are mainly to explain the scope and division of labor. In the operation and decision-making of the organization, they work in a horizontal and consensus-based manner without a hierarchical structure.

Li Xiaotian, Feng Junhua and Zhu Jianlin have left HBstaition in early 2022, and it is now being continued by Liang Jianhua. HBstation is currently relocating its headquarters space from North Huangbian Road to North Xiaoyuan Road (Haizhu District), as well as registering a new WeChat public website. Both are about how to continue the long-term vision of Huangbian Station: to promote the association of practice subjects from different regions and backgrounds, to encourage self-organization, and to construct a platform for joint work and self-education oriented to contemporary contexts. In short, how to maintain the exploration of collective and community creativity and its alternative, communal nature, while creatively engaging in it.

== Art Project Lab ==
=== Exhibitions ===
The Art Project Lab allows any young person who has completed an undergraduate program but has been working for less than 5 years to apply for. They need to send a description of what they have done in the past 2–3 years and a proposal outlining what they want to achieve at HB Station. The Art Project Lab set these criteria in order to make sure the applicants know enough about the discipline to communicate, express their ideas, and think critically. The project emphasizing the realization of a work, about the process, methodology and thinking, rather than just organizing an exhibition.

The exhibitions include: Doreen Chan: Hard Cream (2019), Huang Jingyuan: Soulmates (2019), Chen Jialu: Seemingly Harmless (2018), Wei: See you later alligator (2018), Catherine Chen: Beyond the Land (2017), Du Zhongjian: Turning Stone into Gold (2017), Huang He: Walnuts (2017), Lin Ruixiang: Chaos Tune (2015), Ou Feihong: I Came back from Huangshan for 20 Years (2015), Huang Zhoutuo: Be Allowed to Paint (2014), Du Zhongjian: Testing of the waters (2014), Huang He: Beads of Sweat (2014), Double Colour Balls Group: Signifier 6000 (2014), Feng Weijing: 1'07'' (2013), Li Zhiyong：Blinding Blinding Bright (2013), Why to Close HB Station (2013), Shi Yijie: Everything makes me distracted-King's Games (2013), Hu Haocong: Pack-drop of water (2013), Song Tienan: Compromise with Life (2013), Zhang Li: Art Possessions/Artist Production (2013), Sitarr Huang/Jiaxin Lee: Green homeland, blue ocean (2013), Ce: When you are the letter, I am the postman I meant to be (2013), and Zhu Jianlin: Achievement.

=== Activities ===
Activities include Wu-i Kensha: Exercise together (2014) and BAUREIHE：6898/338 (2013).

=== Zines ===
HB Station published several zines, including Du Zhongjian's Testing of The Waters and Turning Stone into Gold and Blinding blinding bright.

== Companion ==
Companion is a publication published by HB Station. Its editors are Fung Junhua, Zhu Jianlin and Li Xiaotian. Companion aims at collaborating the "status of the youth", which stems from the tradition of "self-organize" at HB Station. In the original concept, Companion first presents the status and thinking of young talents in different regions and fields when creating and participating in practice, and also presents various practical cases and knowledge paths based on local experience. It takes the writing of artists, writers and comprehensive actors as the main content. These writings are not academic, but serious.
