= Paul Gladston =

Professor of contemporary art

Paul Gladston (born 18 May 1964 in North Shields UK) is the inaugural Judith Neilson Chair Professor of Contemporary Art at the University of New South Wales, Sydney. He was trained at Edinburgh College of Art - BA (hons.) 1st Class, Drawing, Painting and Printmaking (1986) - and the University of Nottingham - Ph.D. Critical Theory (2004) and MA Critical Theory (1997).

The UNSW Judith Neilson Chair of Contemporary Art (JNCCA) leads an international network dedicated to research, advocacy and teaching in the field of contemporary art/cultural studies, with a particular emphasis on the Sinosphere (Mainland China, Hong Kong, Taiwan and related diasporas) as well as East Asia more widely. The JNCCA is supported by a multi-million Australian dollar endowment gifted to UNSW by the philanthropist, gallery owner and collector of contemporary Chinese art Judith Neilson.

Gladston was previously the Professor of Visual Cultures and Critical Theory (2015-2018) and an Associate Professor in Culture, Film and Media (2010-2015) at the University of Nottingham, UK and, prior to that, the inaugural Head of the School of International Communications at the University of Nottingham Ningbo, China.

He was the founding Head of the Institute of Comparative Cultural Studies (ICCS), at the University of Nottingham Ningbo, China (2005-2010) and the founding Director of the Centre for Contemporary East-Asian Cultural Studies (CEACS), at the University of Nottingham, UK (2012-2018). He was also the founding editor of the academic Journal of Contemporary Chinese Art (Intellect) (2014-2017) and is the founding editor of the scholarly book series Contemporary East Asian Visual Culture, Society and Politics (Palgrave Macmillan) (2020–present).

Gladston is a Member of the Board of Trustees of the journal Third Text (2023–present) and was a Guest Professor at the London campus of Sotheby’s Institute of Art (2017).

Paul Gladston is better known in China by the style name 葛思谛.

== Research ==
Gladston's research and writing on Sinospheric contemporary art is recognized for its development of trans-cultural narratives informed by contemporary critical theory

There has been published criticism of his work for its use of deconstructivist methodologies and unrelenting problematization of nationalist essentialist interpretations of Chinese and European/American cultural identity, including in a published exchange of articles with the Chinese art historian and curator Gao Minglu in the journal Yishu.

Gladston's academic research, writing and curatorship over the last two decades has sought to counter such criticism by situating deconstructivist theory/practice and localized Chinese discourses in mutually transformative critical polylogues. His most recent academic writing places Chinese contemporary art and visual culture in relation to historical relays of transculturality between Chinese and other cultures and the continuation of such relays under the multi-polar conditionalities of present-day post-Cold War contemporaneity. His work has been translated into Chinese and Russian.

== Publications ==
Paul Gladston has published numerous monographs, edited anthologies, book chapters and journal articles in both scholarly and artworld contexts.

Gladston’s writing shows a significant evolution in critical thinking over the last two decades. His early writing is most strongly informed by European/American poststructuralist and postcolonialist theory. More recent publications highlight Gladston’s now signature identification of culturally complex and shifting critical-interpretative frameworks - resonant with the Derridean concept of ‘supplementarity’ – which combine intersecting though ultimately unreconcilable cultural standpoints. His work has been translated into Chinese and Russian.

Gladston was almost certainly the first English-language writer to publicly criticise the artist Ai Weiwei in a series of articles for the online journal Ran Dian.

The JNCCA has recently launched a bi-lingual Chinese-English book series, titled the JNCCA Editions which is ‘designed to make previously inaccessible scholarly and artworld content available to global audiences.’

Gladston’s book length publications include:

- Paul Gladston, Lynne Howarth-Gladston, Jason Kuo and Johnson Tsong-zung Chang eds. (2024), Rethinking Displays of Chinese Contemporary Art: Cultural Diversity and Tradition, London and Singapore: Palgrave.
- Haiping Yan, Haina Jin and Paul Gladston eds. (2023), Translation Studies and China, London and Beijing: Routledge.
- Paul Gladston (2023), Художественные группы "Авангард" в Китае - 1979-1989 [‘Avant-garde’ Art Groups in China, 1979-1989], Boston MA: Academic Studies Press. [Contemporary Eastern Studies in the Russian Language].
  - Revised Russian language translation of Paul Gladston (2013), ‘Avant-garde Art Groups in China, 1979-1989, Bristol: Intellect and Chicago: University of Chicago Press.
- Paul Gladston, Beccy Kennedy-Schtyk and Ming Turner eds. (2021), Visual Culture Wars at the Borders of Contemporary China: Art, Design, Film, New Media and the Prospects of “Post-West” Contemporaneity, London: Palgrave Macmillan.
- Paul Gladston (2019), Contemporary Chinese Art, Aesthetic Modernity and Zhang Peili: Towards a Critical Contemporaneity, London: Bloomsbury.
- Paul Gladston (2016), Deconstructing Contemporary Chinese Art: Selected Critical Writings and Conversations, 2007-2014, Heidelberg-Berlin: Springer Verlag.
- Paul Gladston (2015), Yu Youhan, Shanghai: 3030 Press and ShanghArt Gallery.
- Paul Gladston (2014), Contemporary Chinese Art: A Critical History, London: Reaktion and Chicago: University of Chicago Press.
  - Winner of ‘best publication’ at the Awards of Art China (2015).
- Paul Gladston (2013), ‘Avant-garde’ Art Groups in China, 1979-1989, Bristol: Intellect and Chicago: University of Chicago Press.
- Paul Gladston (2012), Contemporary Art in Shanghai: Conversations with Seven Chinese Artists, Hong Kong: Blue Kingfisher/Timezone 8.

== Exhibitions ==
Gladston has co-curated, funded or been an academic advisor to several international exhibitions of Chinese contemporary art. Gladston’s curatorial work with Lynne Howarth-Gladston on a number of these exhibitions involves a continuing critical dialogue with the Hong Kong-based curator Johnson Tsong-Zung Chang’s conception of the ‘Yellow Box’ – an intimist intervention with the internationally dominant mode of gallery and museum display known as the White Cube intended to be more conducive to the showing of Chinese art. Gladston and Howarth-Gladston have published several articles critical of the inherent cultural exceptionalism of the Yellow Box which also propose the idea of trans-/culturally differential ‘poly/cacophonic’ modes of artistic display.

Gladston and Howarth-Gladston will co-curate a group exhibition of contemporary video art from the Sinosphere at the SOAS Gallery, University of London UK in 2026 with the artist and curator Yique and the art critic and curator Lin Zi.

- 2024 - Funder of and curatorial advisor to the exhibition ‘Strange Wonders: Jizi and pioneers of contemporary ink from China’, SOAS Gallery, University of London UK.
- 2024 - Curatorial co-ordinator/co-curator of the exhibition 'Yique's Way', Ugly Duck, London UK.
- 2024 - Co-curator with Lynne Howarth-Gladston of the exhibition 'Rain on the Platform: Tan Lijie - Selected Works', the National Chen-kung University Gallery, Taiwan.
- 2023 - Co-curator with Lynne Howarth-Gladston of the exhibition 'Enchanted Realities: Tan Lijie - Selected Works, 2013-2020', Salamanca Arts Centre and Derwent Arts, Hobart Australia.
- 2021 - Co-curator with Lynne Howarth-Gladston of the exhibition 'Dis-/Continuing Traditions: Contemporary Video Art from China', Salamanca Arts Centre, Hobart Australia.
- 2015 - Co-curator with Lynne Howarth-Gladston of the exhibition 'New China/ New Art: Contemporary Video from Shanghai and Hangzhou', Djanogly Gallery University of Nottingham UK.
- 2012 - Academic advisor to the internationally acclaimed exhibition 'Art of Change: New Directions from China', Hayward Gallery-South Bank Centre, London UK.
