= Duan Jianyu =

Chinese visual artist

Duan Jianyu (段建宇, born 1970) is a prominent contemporary visual artist from China and writer. The artist is primarily known for her surrealist-style of paintings that draw from a range of art histories, including European-American modernism, Chinese ink painting, and Chinese Socialist Realism.

== Early life and education ==
Duan Jianyu was raised in a well-educated family in Zhengzhou, the capital city of Henan. Her mother worked at the widely renowned state bookshop "Xinhua," known as the largest in the country, while her father pursued a career as a writer. Growing up in this environment, Jianyu developed a deep fascination with characters, particularly letters, and harbored a childhood dream of becoming a writer.

Instead of being a writer, Duan Jianyu became a well-known painter. She graduated from Oil Painting Department of the Guangzhou Academy of Fine Arts in 1995. She currently teaches at the Fine Arts Department of South China Normal University in Guangzhou.

== Style and themes ==
Having received her education towards the end of the Cultural Revolution, Duan Jianyu's earlier works skillfully captured the ambiguous impressions and harsh transitions of that tumultuous period. These experiences played a significant role in shaping a prominent psychological characteristic of the artist: an instinctive rebellion against the status quo. In her paintings, Duan aims to create images that challenge conventional acceptance, straightforwardly defying the notion of painting as a linear progression. Instead, she views her artwork as an ongoing process of aesthetic deconstruction, continually pushing the boundaries of artistic expression.

The style of Duan Jianyu's paintings tend to start out with objects or people observed in everyday reality and then appear to fade out and slip slowly into the world of the mind. The theme of localization, which can be defined by vernacular culture, is prominently reflected in Duan Jianyu's work. This kind of narrative technique appears consistently in the artist's creations. Duan's large-scale paintings present incongruous scenarios drawing on a wide range of sources from European art history, classical Chinese painting, and imagery of traditional rural life. Diverse elements—such as European nudes, Chinese landscapes, chickens, watermelons, and air hostesses—come together to explore with wry humor the clashes between urban and rural, tradition and modernity in a society undergoing enormous changes during a period of China's economic reforms and globalization.

She has also created multi-media installations, artist's books, photographs, and ink paintings on cardboard. Similarly, Duan's writings draw on a mixture of characters and events taken from rural life in China and references to international, post-consumerist culture.

== Selected works ==
Duan's most well-known installation work is titled Artistic Chicken (2002), which she originally created for the "Canton Express" exhibition curated by Hou Hanru in 2003 for the "Zone of Urgency (Z.O.U)" project within the 50th Venice Biennale in 2003. Artistic Chicken comprised 100 hand-painted, realistic-looking sculptures of chickens that were installed together on the floor of the gallery. The work was re-installed at the M+ Pavilion in Hong Kong in a re-staging of the "Canton Express" exhibition in 2017, although fewer than half of the original chicken-sculptures had survived.

Being inspired by her famous novelist father Duan Quanfa, she has ventured into writing as a form of expression and has successfully published a novel titled "New York-Paris-Zhumadian".

== Exhibitions ==
Duan Jianyu's artworks have been featured in many exhibitions in China, Asia, and internationally.

Her solo exhibitions include:

- "Automatic Writing – Automatic Understanding," Pond Society (New Century Art Foundation), Shanghai, 2020;
- "Sharp, Sharp, Smart," at Mirrored Gardens, Guangzhou, 2016
- "The Seduction of Village" at Beijing, 2010
- "How to Travel with a Watermelon," at Vitamin Creative Space, Guangzhou
- "Oil Paintings by Duan Jianyu," at Guangzhou, 1994;
- "A Potent Force: Duan Jianyu and Hu Xiaoyuan," at the Rockbund Art Museum, Shanghai, 2013; (Two-person exhibitions)
- "Yúqiáo", at Y.D.P., London, 2025

She has participated in numerous group exhibitions, including:

- "One Hand Clapping," Solomon R. Guggenheim Museum, New York, 2018;
- "Times Heterotopia Trilogy III: The Man Who Never Threw Anything Away, "Times Museum, Guangzhou, 2017;
- "Canton Express: Art from the Pearl River Delta," M+ Pavilion, Hong Kong, 2017
- The 8th Asia Pacific Triennial of Contemporary Art, Queensland Art Gallery and Gallery of Modern Art, Brisbane, Australia, 2015–16;
- “15 Years Chinese Contemporary Art Award,” Power Station of Art, Shanghai, 2014;
- “Dai hanzhi, 5000 artists,” UCCA, Beijing, 2014;
- “A Potent Force: Duan Jianyu and Hu Xiaoyuan”, Rockbund Art Museum, 2013;
- “Ink Art: Past as Present in Contemporary China,” The Metropolitan Museum of Art, New York, 2013;
- “Face,” Mingsheng Art Museum, Shanghai, 2012;
- “Nostalgia East Asia Contemporary Art Exhibition,” Korea Foundation, 2011;
- “China China China!,” Sainsbury Centre For Visual Arts, 2009;
- The 3rd Guangzhou Triennial “Farewell to Post-Colonialism,” Guangdong Museum of Art, Guangzhou, 2008;
- “China Welcomes You... Desires, Struggles, New Identities,” Kunsthaus Graz, 2007;
- “Octomania,” Para Site art space, Hong Kong, 2006;
- The 50th Venice Biennale, 2003;
- The 4th Gwangju Biennale, 2002;
- "City Slang - Contemporary Art from the Zhujiang River Delta", at He Xiangning Museum, Shenzhen, 2001;
- "Human Landscape," at China Art Archives & Warehouse, Beijing, 2001;
- "Plural identity", at South China Normal University, Guangzhou, 1999;
- "Canton Shanghai Beijing", at CIFA Gallery, Beijing, 1996

== Awards ==
Duan Jianyu is the winner of Chinese Contemporary Art Awards 2010, Best Artist.

== Collections ==
M+, Hong Kong

Solomon R. Guggenheim Museum, New York
