= Tao: On the Road and on the Run in Outlaw China =

- Author: Aya Goda
- Translator: Alison Watts
- Language: English
- Genre: Non-Fiction
- Publisher: Portobello Books
- Publication date: 01/07/1995
- Publication place: Japan
- English publication date: 01/08/07
- ISBN: 978-1-84627-025-3

Tao: On the Road and on the Run in Outlaw China written by Aya Goda and translated by Alison Watts, was first published in hardback in 2007, and in paperback in 2008. This travel memoir/biography recounts the journey she undertook crisscrossing China with the artist Cao Yong in 1989, in order to collect the necessary documents so she can help him flee to Japan. The original Japanese version was published by Bungei Shunju in 1995, and awarded 17th Kodansha Non-Fiction award in Japan.

== Background ==
In the 1980s Aya Goda was a Japanese art student who went to China to travel in her summer vacation. In Kashgar she met a fellow painter called Cao Yong with whom she fell in love. The next year when she went back to visit him in Beijing his exhibition in Beijing, and had caught the attention of the Public Security Bureau, who seized and burned several of Yong's paintings, saying they were "Obscene". Fearful of the consequences, Aya decides to marry Yong so he can safely flee China and seek asylum in Japan.

== Synopsis ==
As people protest asking for Democracy in the cities of China and all foreigners are faced with suspicion, an adventuresome Japanese student named Aya Goda travels to the interior of China. There she meets and falls in love with Cao. After his work is banned, the police chase them across much of China and Tibet, until the Japanese embassy finally helps them escape China.

== Reception ==
Rory MacLean writing in The Guardian said: "Tao doesn't begin well" and "For me, these first pages read like a teenage romantic novel". However he also says: "As their exhilarating, eight-month journey grows ever more dangerous, Aya writes with increasing clarity".

Colin Thubron writing for The Times said, "This, in its outlandish way, is a unique memoir. At once naive, tough, stark and sentimental, Tao recounts an eight-month rite of passage in which the reader sees, through its author’s still-innocent eyes, a Japanese art student entering an adolescent dream of love on the road".

The organisation behind World Book Day published a list of "Most Worth Talking about Books" to launch its new Spread the Word website with Tao as one of the books in the list. First published in English in 2008.

The novel was awarded the prestigious Noma Prize for Non-Fiction from Kodansha Japan's largest publisher, in 1995.

== Bibliography ==
- Goda, Aya (2008). Tao: On the Road and on the Run in Outlaw China. Portobello Books. ISBN 978-1-84627-025-3.
