= Chinese Apartment Art =

1970s–1990s art movement in China

Chinese Apartment Art (simplified Chinese: 公寓艺术; traditional Chinese: 公寓藝術; pinyin: gōng yù yì shù) is the avant-garde art that was produced underground during the 1970s–1990s in China. The literal meaning of apartment in Chinese is "government-owned residential complex" or "public house". Chinese artists created private work space within public residential complexes out of sight of authorities. The pieces tend to be smaller as to fit on the confines of the living spaces.Their government was communist, where they dictated to their people. They would control people's lives, as it can be reported in public media. The people were living under strict rule. Their government would maintain control over the people. The government would censor the public media that express negative views about the government. The artists, one of them being strict under the rule, because the government thinks they would express their opinion through their art. There are a few well-known artists that were involved with the avant-garde movement that occurred between the 1970s and 1990s in China. They would host their art pieces in their private apartments to express what their lives were like under communism.

== History ==
=== Origins ===
Apartment art, a term created by Gao Minglu, emerged as a result of the Anti-Spiritual pollution campaign in 1983, which aimed to suppress Western- influence liberal ideas among the Chinese population. Apartment artists often utilized everyday household items and domestic objects that were symbolic of the physical context in their homes, focusing mainly on the tangible and observable in their physical environment. Apartment art “partly became a response to the suppressed arts ecology of China, and the artists changing relationship with their local context, transforming the social agency and cultural role of Chinese artists at the time.

Apartment art in the 1990s became a self-critical response to the avant-garde movement itself, as artists began to recognize the detriment of the commercial art market upon the Chinese arts ecology.

=== Phases ===
According to an exhibition hosted by the University of Pittsburgh in 2016 entitled “Chinese Apartment Art: Primary Documents from Gao Minglu’s Archive, 1970s-1990s,” Chinese Apartment Art is separated into three different phases. These phases are separated by differing characteristics, display, and shaped by the ever-changing political landscapes.

==== Family Salon (Late 1970s/Early 1980s) ====
This phase of the movement was created as a result of artists rejecting Socialist Realism. It was characterized by small, Salon-style exhibitions. These were often held in safer, foreign apartments showing off Impressionist and abstract paintings. An influential artist during this phase is Zhu Jinshi.

==== Projects on Paper (1980s-90s) ====
This phase featured a rise in mail art with widespread distributions through low-budget publications and photocopies. This bypassed gallery restrictions to "curate" multi-city exhibitions. Influential artists during this phase included Wang Luyan, Geng Jianyi, and Wang Jin.

==== Household Art Practice & Display (1990s) ====
This phase was definitively split by the Tiananmen square massacre. After this event, contemporary art was deemed outlawed and many artists fled the country and continued to make art in their private homes using domestic materials exploring everyday life. This movement included artists such as Song Dong, Wang Youshen, and Zhu Jinshi.

Other important artists during this movement include Yin Xiuzhen, Qin Yufen, Lin Tianmiao, Wang Gongxin, and Shi Yong.

== Examples ==
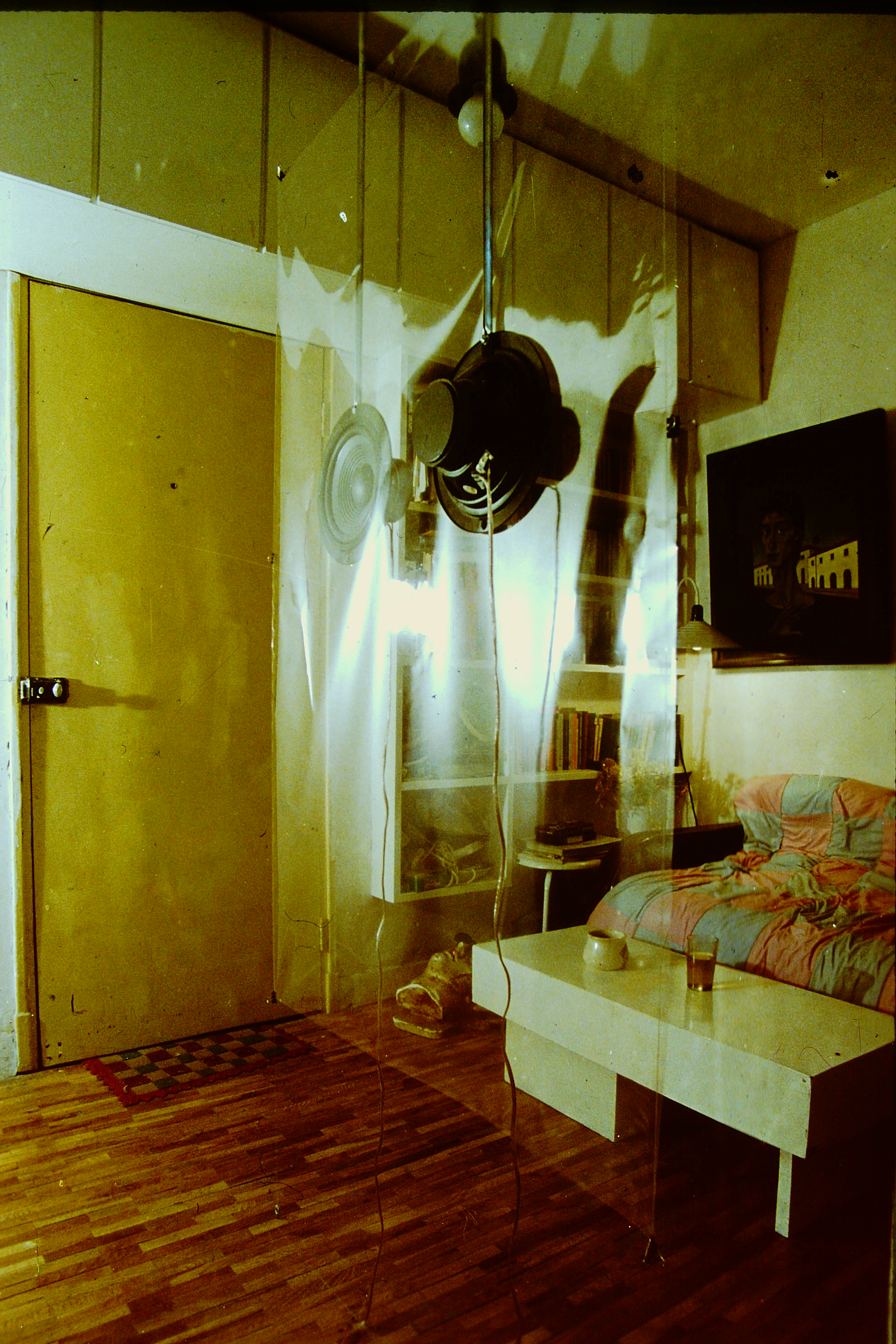
Amplification Site: A Cross Echo In A Private Living Space by Shi Yong (1995)

Amplification Site: A Cross-Echo in a Private Living Space:

In 1995, Shi Yong created this art piece in his private apartment. He installed several speakers that amplify any input sounds from the surrounding environment. The speakers were fixated on plastic films which allowed them to scatter throughout the whole apartment, living room, bedroom and even the bathroom. With the installation of these speakers, it acts as an overt defiance to Shi’s privacy, encompassing the idea behind the work: how exposures of privacy could yield anxiety and fear.

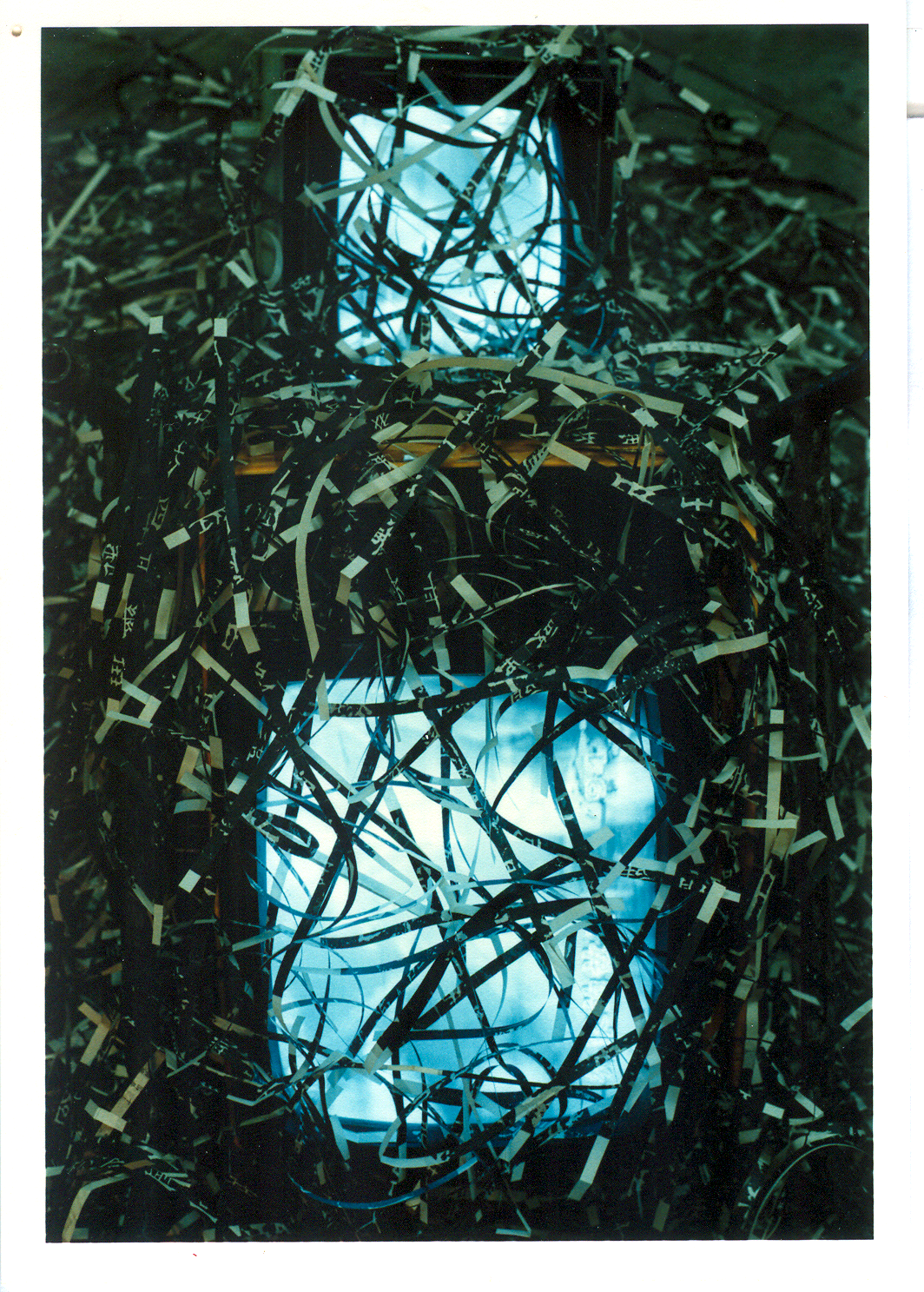
Culture Noodle by Song Dong (1994)

Culture Noodle (1994):

The process of this artwork is rather simple and straightforward. Song Dong shredded pages of Chinese books with a shredder, and allowed the processed scraps to accumulate on the floor and on everyday objects such as TVs. The finished slices of paper closely resembled a popular folk food noodle in China, resulting in the work's name "Culture Noodle". Making allusions to food with the work's title, Song might want to highlight the necessity of books and the literary symbolism for culture.
