= Out of Context (exhibition) =

Out of Context is a self-organized art exhibition in Hong Kong that took place from 9 to 10 October 1987 at a now-demolished Eu family mansion on 15 Kennedy Road. Co-curated by Christine Loh, Hugh Chiverton and Lianne Hackett, and presented in association with the Hong Kong Arts Centre, the exhibition displayed works by twenty-one artists, artist groups and practitioners, ranging from painting, sculpture, photography to installation, performance and video art. Out of Context provides a glimpse of the contemporary arts scene in Hong Kong during the '80s, filling in a period in Hong Kong art history that is often not widely documented and circulated. In addition, taking place three years after the signing of the Sino–British Joint Declaration, a historical moment for Hong Kong, some of the works expressed concerns towards the 1997 Handover from a cultural perspective.

== Background ==
The exhibition was conceived primarily in response to the artists’ belief that there was a “serious lack of [institutional] support” for the local contemporary arts scene at the time, and the organizers also felt that established art institutions had too much dominance over the art scene.

Collaborative in nature, a series of meetings were held in preparation for the exhibition, which were attended by participating artists, art administrators and writers. Taking place outside of the traditional gallery/museum space, they had more creative and artistic freedom by working “out of context”. In terms of location, format and artistic practices, this exhibition was unconventional, bringing forth and making visible what was often marginalized.

The arts feature of the Hong Kong Standard on 12 October 1987 said this of the exhibition: “... it did not set out to display what Hongkong has achieved in fine art, rather what it may soon lose: freedom of expression through legislation, emigration, and a failing commitment to deal with real experience, and instead follow officially approved conventions.”

== Artists ==
Gao Minglu, editor of Inside Out: New Chinese Art, described the participants as "young, avant garde artists".

Participating artists of the exhibition included Adevor; Antonio MAK, 麥顯揚; CHOI Ronald Yeekie; CHOI Yanchi, 蔡仞姿; Epoxy; FUNG Manyee, 馮敏兒; HO Hingkay Oscar, 何慶基; Holly LEE, 黃楚喬; Josh HON, 韓偉康; Larry DEMING; LAU Gukzik, 劉掬色; LEE Kasing Wingo, 李家昇; Ming FAY, 費明杰; Robert FUNG, 馮萬剛; Robert O'BRIEN, 白禮仁; Jim SHUM, 沈聖德; Sunny PANG, 彭錦耀; Susi KRAMER; Tommy Wong, 王志強; WONG Yankwai Yank, 黃仁逵; and YEUNG Sauchurk Ricky, 楊秀卓.

The Epoxy Art Group placed images of missiles on a wall with names and photocopies of some people.

The exhibition catalogue offers descriptions and profiles of each individual artist.

== Press Reports ==
1. 顏悉：〈展覽館外的周末事件〉，《明報週刊》，1987.
2. Concern for future arts shown Out of Context, Hongkong Standard/extra, 12 October 1987.
3. 藝術圈「外圍」的活動。
4. 日月：〈古屋中的藝術展覽〉，《文匯報》，1987年10月16日。
