= Kerr Neilson =

Australian businessman

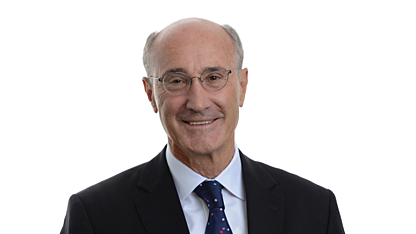
- Born: 1949; Johannesburg, South Africa
- Education: University of Cape Town
- Occupation: Investment manager
- Known for: Founder, Platinum Asset Management; Principal, Neilson Family Office - Argyle Fund
- Spouse: Judith Neilson (div. 2015)
- Children: 2
- Website: https://argylefund.com/

Kerr Neilson (born in 1949) is a South African-born Australian investment manager. Widely regarded as one of Australia's pioneer global equity investors, Neilson founded Platinum Asset Management in 1994 and managed its global equity portfolios for 24 years. His stock-picking acumen and consistent outperformance earned him the moniker "Australia's Warren Buffett". He is the principal of the Neilson Family Office, Argyle Fund.

== Early life and education ==
Kerr Neilson was born in Johannesburg, South Africa in 1949. He first demonstrated a penchant for investing when he bought his first stock at the age of 13. In 1971, Neilson graduated with a Bachelor of Commerce from the University of Cape Town.

== Career ==
Neilson began his career in 1973 as an investment analyst in the pensions department of Courtaulds in London, before joining mutual fund manager Sage Holdings in South Africa in 1976 where he assisted in the management of the South African equities portfolio. From 1978 to 1983, Neilson headed the industrial equities research department at Anderson, Wilson & Partners Inc, a stockbroking firm in Johannesburg.

=== Bankers Trust Australia ===
Upon migrating to Australia, Neilson joined Bankers Trust Australia Group in May 1983, where he rose from the role of analyst in the wholesale funds management division to Executive Vice President and senior portfolio manager of multiple retail equity trusts. The funds he was responsible for had total funds under management of approximately A$5 billion at the time of his departure in January 1994.

At Bankers Trust, Neilson built a reputation for being an astute contrarian stock-picker and achieved outstanding returns across multiple funds:

- BT Select Markets Fund +22.7% per annum 1984-1993.
- BT Select Markets Imputation Fund +18.6% per annum 1986-1992.
- BT Select Markets LATAM Fund +79.8% per annum 1991-1993.

Neilson rose to fame after the October 1987 Black Monday stock market crash when his funds demonstrated remarkable resilience during down markets. During the Australia fiscal year of 1988, the BT Select Imputations Fund achieved +39.8%. By comparison, the Australian All Ordinaries Index fell 13.3%.

=== Platinum Asset Management ===
Neilson founded Platinum Asset Management in 1994 with several former colleagues from Bankers Trust Australia Group and the financial backing of George Soros. With a large retail investor following, Platinum Asset Management was Australia's first fund management company that specialised in international equities. It listed on the ASX under the ticker "PTM" in May 2007 and managed nearly A$30 billion at its peak in 2015-2018.

Neilson served as the CEO and Managing Director of Platinum Asset Management from the company’s inception in February 1994 until June 2018 when he handed the reigns to Andrew Clifford. He also held the role of Chief Investment Officer from inception until May 2013.

Neilson held portfolio management responsibilities for Platinum’s flagship fund, the Platinum International Fund, as well as several of its other long-short and long-only global equity funds and mandates, from their respective inception dates until June 2018. Under his management, the Platinum International Fund compounded at 13% (after fees) per annum for 23 years, nearly doubling the 6.8% achieved by the MSCI All Country World Net Index (AUD) over the same period.

The success of Platinum Asset Management was in large attributed to Neilson's ability to transcend short-term market turbulence and focus on long-term returns, to avoid the madness of the crowd and find value in neglected companies. During the 2000 tech boom and bust, the Platinum International Fund rose 59% from 2000 to 2003 while the MSCI All Country World Index fell by 31%, once again proving the resilience of Neilson's contrarian approach.

After stepping down from the role of Managing Director and relinquishing portfolio management responsibilities in June 2018, Neilson remained an Executive Director of Platinum Asset Management until August 2020 and thereafter as a Non-Executive Director until November 2022.

In 2015 Neilson gave a talk on what makes a great investor. Controlling one's emotions is the first priority but in addition, the talk suggested, it is essential to avoid availability bias and extrapolation.

In 2018 Neilson penned a widely read blog titled 'The Beautiful Game' of Investing.

=== Argyle Fund | Neilson Family Office ===
After retiring from portfolio management and investment research responsibilities at Platinum Asset Management in 2020, Neilson remained active in financial markets and continued to manage investments personally and for The Neilson Foundation through his family office, Argyle Fund.

== Awards and honours ==
Widely regarded as one of Australia’s most celebrated investors in global equities, Neilson has received numerous industry awards over the years, including:

- the 2002 Hall of Fame Award by the Australian Fund Manager Foundation;
- the 2014 Money Management Lifetime Achievement Award – the first fund manager to be honoured with this award;
- the 2019 Industry Contribution Award by the Zenith Fund Awards.

== Philanthropy ==
Kerr Neilson and his family established The Neilson Foundation in 2007 to support both the arts and charities that work towards social cohesion. Since its inception, The Neilson Foundation has disbursed more than A$185 million to more than 40 organisations. The Neilson Foundation favours innovative initiatives in two principal areas:

- Those that improve accessibility to the arts, with the aim of enriching cultural diversity within Australian society; and
- Those organisations that assist individuals and communities facing extreme disadvantage. Programmes that help vulnerable youth, migrants, domestic violence, or those with mental health problems.

== Personal life ==
Kerr Neilson and his former wife, Judith Neilson, divorced in 2015. They have two children. In 2009, Kerr and Judith Neilson established the White Rabbit Gallery in Chippendale Sydney to display Judith Neilson's collection of Chinese contemporary art. Judith Neilson accumulated the collection from frequent visits to art galleries and artist studios across China since 2000; and has one of the world's most significant collections of contemporary Chinese art. The White Rabbit Collection has been reported in many publications as a collection without comparison.

== Net worth ==
In 2007, Kerr Neilson floated 20% of Platinum Asset Management on the ASX. The majority of the shares Neilson retained (57%) were valued at A$2.9 billion. Neilson was listed in Forbes' lists of Australia's 50 richest people from 2010 until 2019. In 2023, his net worth was assessed at US$960 million, according to Forbes. As of May 2025, the Financial Review assessed Neilson's net worth as A$1.67 billion in the 2025 Rich List. His former wife's net worth has been reported separately since 2015.

Year	Financial Review Rich List		Forbes Australia's 50 Richest	
Year	Rank	Net worth (A$)	Rank	Net worth (US$)
2013^{[note 1]}	35 ▲	$2.43 billion ▲		
2014^{[note 1]}	10 ▲	$3.35 billion ▲		
2015				
2016				
2017				
2018	35	$1.78 billion ▲		
2019	60 ▼	$1.49 billion ▼		
2020	73 ▼	$1.38 billion ▼		
2021	73	$1.55 billion ▲		
2022	111 ▼	$1.30 billion ▲		
2023	116 ▼	$1.24 billion ▼		$960 million
2024		$1.60 billion ▲		
2025	105	$1.67 billion ▲		

Legend
Icon	Description
Steady	Has not changed from the previous year
▲	Has increased from the previous year
▼	Has decreased from the previous year

Notes

- ^[note 1]: Prior to 2015, net worth was reported in the name of Kerr Neilson only. From 2015, net worth was separated with individual listings for Kerr Neilson and for Judith Neilson.

== Publications ==
Two booklets have been published by Platinum Asset Management, titled Reflections on Investment and Curious Investor Behaviour. In compiling the booklets, Neilson explains his reflections on investing. In the foreword, Neilson states that investing leans heavily on common sense, which is both a prop and a hindrance to the learning process.
