= Xiao Ge =

Chinese artist

Xiao Ge, an artist and curator, was born in an art family of Shanghai in 1971. She graduated from Middle School Affiliated to China Academy of Art and then the Printmaking Department of China Central Academy of Fine Arts. In late 1995, Xiao went to France and successively studied in Universite De Provence Aix-Marseille, Oil Painting and Inter Media Art Department of école nationale supérieure des Beaux-arts de Paris, Ecole De La Chambre Syndicale De La Couture Parisienne and International Cultural Exchange Department of Université de Vincennes à Saint-Denis, where she received double bachelor's degrees and double master's degrees. Xiao returned to China in 2009 and now she lives and works in Beijing and Paris.

== Work experience ==
In 2012, Xiao served as head of preparatory committee and director of Xiao Feng and Song Rens' Art Museum;

2010, Xiao Ge has been the vice president to "China Contemporary Art Foundation" and has planned a series of events and exhibitions, including 2010 Chinese Contemporary Art Golden Palm and Golden Razzies;

From May 2009 to November 2009, Xiao worked as Director of Public Relations at Gao Minglu Contemporary Art Center;

From January 2009 to May 2009, Xiao worked as Director of International Department at artintern.net

In 2009, she served as a press officer to "Shanghai Art Fair International Contemporary Art Exhibition" in Asia Pacific region;

From 2005 to 2008, Xiao Ge was engaged as a director to the Italian Center in China and participated in planning several international cultural exchange projects；

== As a Curator ==
The exhibitions curated by Xiao Ge include:

2013 "Maryn Varbanov & Song Huai-Kuei' s Fiber Retrospective Exhibition" in the Cité internationale des arts of Paris

2013 "The Grand Canal" Collateral Event of the 55th International Art Exhibition – La Biennale di Venezia, Curator

2012 "Zhongshan Park Project" of 9th Shanghai Biennale 2012, "On the Way Home – Shanghai Pudong International Airport Special Exhibition, Special Guest Curator

2009 - 2010 "Warm Winter Project", Chief Curator

2009 "Shanghai Art Fair International Contemporary Art Exhibition", Press Officer of Asia Pacific region

2007 "Vision Féminine six Chinese artists in Venice", Co-Curator

== Exhibitions ==
As an active artist, Xiao Ge has her works represented in France, Italy and China, covering a various forms such as painting, installation and performance. Her main exhibitions include:

2012 Xiao Feng and His Family

2008 1st International Biennial of Contemporary Art in Sabbioneta

2008 "un altro sguardo" - Turin Photo Festival

2007 Periphery event "Between East and West" of 52nd Venice Biennale

2006 OPEN 9 - Esposizione Internazionale di Sculpture ed Installazioni

2006 "International Art Saloon" in Florence, Italy

2004 "Parallel World: Lille-Shanghai Express Train" in EU Extravaganza

2000 "Hour Rate-Xiao Ge's Art Exhibition" in the Cité internationale des arts in Paris, France

== See also ==
- Chinese Art
- 798 Art Zone
- China Central Academy of Fine Arts
