= Chen Yanning =

Chinese-American oil painter

Chen Yanning (Chinese: 陈衍宁; born 1945) is a Chinese-American oil painter. Born in Guangzhou, Chen studied at Guangzhou Academy of Fine Arts before graduating in 1965. He remained in the province working as a painter for the academy until 1986, when he emigrated to the United States to study at Oklahoma City University. His early Chinese works include the poster Chairman Mao Inspects the Guangdong Countryside (1972) and New Doctor of the Fishing Port (1973).

His commissioned portraitures include Queen Elizabeth (1999), Aung San Suu Kyi (1997) and Richard Branson.
