= Zheng Guogu =

Chinese artist (born 1970)

Zheng Guogu (Chinese: 郑国谷, born 1970) is an artist based in Yangjiang in the Guangdong province of China, one of three artists in the artist collective known as Yangjiang Group. In 1992, he graduated from the printmaking department of the Guangzhou Academy of Fine Arts.

Guogu makes work in different media including photography, installation, painting and sculpture. His photographic work questions the post-Cultural Revolution generation's attitudes to the world around them and has used of contact sheets to make storyboard-like images. Guogu ives and works in Yangjiang, Guangdong province. He was the winner of the 2006 Chinese Contemporary Art Reward.

== Early life ==
Zheng Guogu was born in 1970 in Yangjiang, in the southwest part of Guangdong province. Known for its knife and scissor factories, it is situated on the edge of the China South Sea. Yangjiang became a town in 1988 when farmers and others from the outlying rural areas were encouraged to move there to participate in a new economic enterprise zone. Zheng Guogu comes from an artistic family. His father is a traditional instrument maker and a singer, who has at times worked for the Hong Kong Opera, a five-hour drive east from Yangjiang.

During the years that Zheng Guogu was growing up, things were already changing in China as the Maoist period receded into the past and the country opened up to the rest of the world. He and his generation had access to the West and Hong Kong through television, pirated CVDs of Hollywood films and computer games. So although he was physically isolated, he was accessing the West, albeit virtually, at a young enough age so as to take these new experiences and freedoms for granted. He attended the Guangdong Academy of Art in Guangzhou, China's third culture capital, with a focus on printmaking.

While a student there, he was introduced to a slightly older group of artists that formed the Big Tail Elephant Group (Lin Yilin, Chen Shaoxiong, Xu Tan and Liang Juhui) in 1991, and they encouraged the younger artist to experiment with performance and conceptual art.

== Artist profile ==
Zheng Guogu is one among a growing number of postmodern artists who have been reacting to the rapid shifts taking place in China over the past ten years by giving artistic shape to the phases of social and economic transformation. What distinguishes him is his commitment to the local culture of his hometown and his role in directing attention to it, while engaging with trends in global contemporary art. The international art world has fallen in love with contemporary Chinese art, and somehow Zheng Guogu, although often included in group exhibitions in Asia and Europe, has not been singled out often enough. He juggles fact with fiction or myth, while controlling the entry points to his community for visitors from the art world, who make the trek to visit him in the small town where he lives and works.

== "Through Popular Expression" display ==
Zheng Guogu's works in his "Through Popular Expression" display are the response of the artist to commercial trends. His work Computer controlled by pig's brain No. 59 belongs to his series Computer controlled by pig's brain (豬腦控制電腦). Put on the leatherette-canvas, the elements engender a corresponding 'fancy' effect. The Computer controlled by pig's brain series is a refraction of how the media is overflowing and stimulating our everyday life. In this series, Zheng uses different elements of Hong Kong pop-culture magazines, which address people's senses and their attraction to our consumerist branding culture. The M+ Museum has Computer controlled by pig's brain No. 44, one of the works in this series, in its permanent collection.

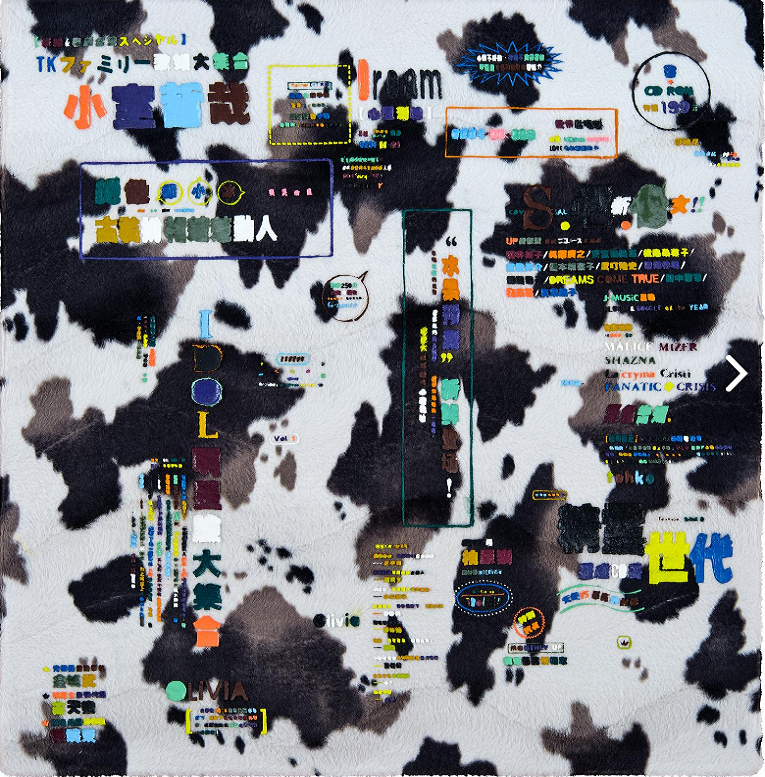
Computer controlled by pig's brain No. 26

Sewing for Another Two Thousand Years is a textile work and part of his needlepoint series, in which traditional canvas painting incorporates elements resembling embroidered carpets or wallpaper.The One Hundred and Fifty 10,000 Customers series was created as an homage to Hans van Dijk, a Dutch curator who influenced contemporary Chinese art after 1985. The series also engages with the concept of producing works intended for large-scale distribution within the art market, theoretically consisting of multiple pieces.Each work consists of a grid of small photographs forming a larger image based on daily news imagery, often incorporating repeated visual elements such as motorcycles.

== Selected exhibitions ==
2019

Zheng Guogu: Visionary Transformation, MoMA PS1, New York

2016

Chinese Whispers, Museum of Fine Arts Bern, Bern, Switzerland

Unwritten Rules Cannot Be Broken, Guggenheim Museum, New York

2007

The Real Thing: Contemporary Art from China, Tate Liverpool, UK

2006

Through Popular Expression, The University of Central England in Birmingham, UK

Take Down, Beijing

Kunstmuseum Bern, Switzerland

2005

Out of Sight, Amsterdam

Puzzle—It is from Yangjiang, Grace Alexander Contemporary Art Gallery, Switzerland

Millennium, Mori Art Museum, Tokyo

2004

A l'ouest du sud de l'est, Center of Contemporary Art, Sète/Villa Arson in Nice, France

From China, ICP International Center of Photography, New York

My Home Is Your Museum, Vitamin Creative Space, Guangzhou

2003

50th Biennale di Venezia, Venezia, Italy

2002

Paris-Pekin, Espace Pierre Cardin, Paris

Are You Going to Enjoy Calligraphy or Measure Blood Pressure? Shanghai

2000

More Dimensional, Caaw, Beijing

2001

Hamburger Bahnhof Museum für Gegenwart, Berlin Art Forum

== Individual Pieces Of Work ==
- Guogu's piece titled "Ad, Rust For Another Two Thousand Years (set of 33, various sizes)"—auction results
