= Tuan =

Tuan may refer to:

- Brush-tailed phascogale, an Australian marsupial animal also known as tuan
- Zaiyi (1856–1923), Prince Duan (or Prince Tuan), a Qing Dynasty prince and statesman
- Duan (surname), a Chinese surname spelled as Tuan in the older Wade–Giles romanisation
- Tuan mac Cairill, a figure in Irish mythology
- Tuan (band), an Irish music band formed by Brendan McFarlane
- Tuan Tuan and Yuan Yuan, giant pandas sent by mainland China to Taiwan in 2008
- Tuan, a respectful Malaysian term meaning "Sir"
- Tuan, a Sri Lankan first name originating from the Malaysian term for "Sir" and used by Sri Lankans of Malay origin
- Tuấn, a Vietnamese male given name
