= White Rabbit Gallery =

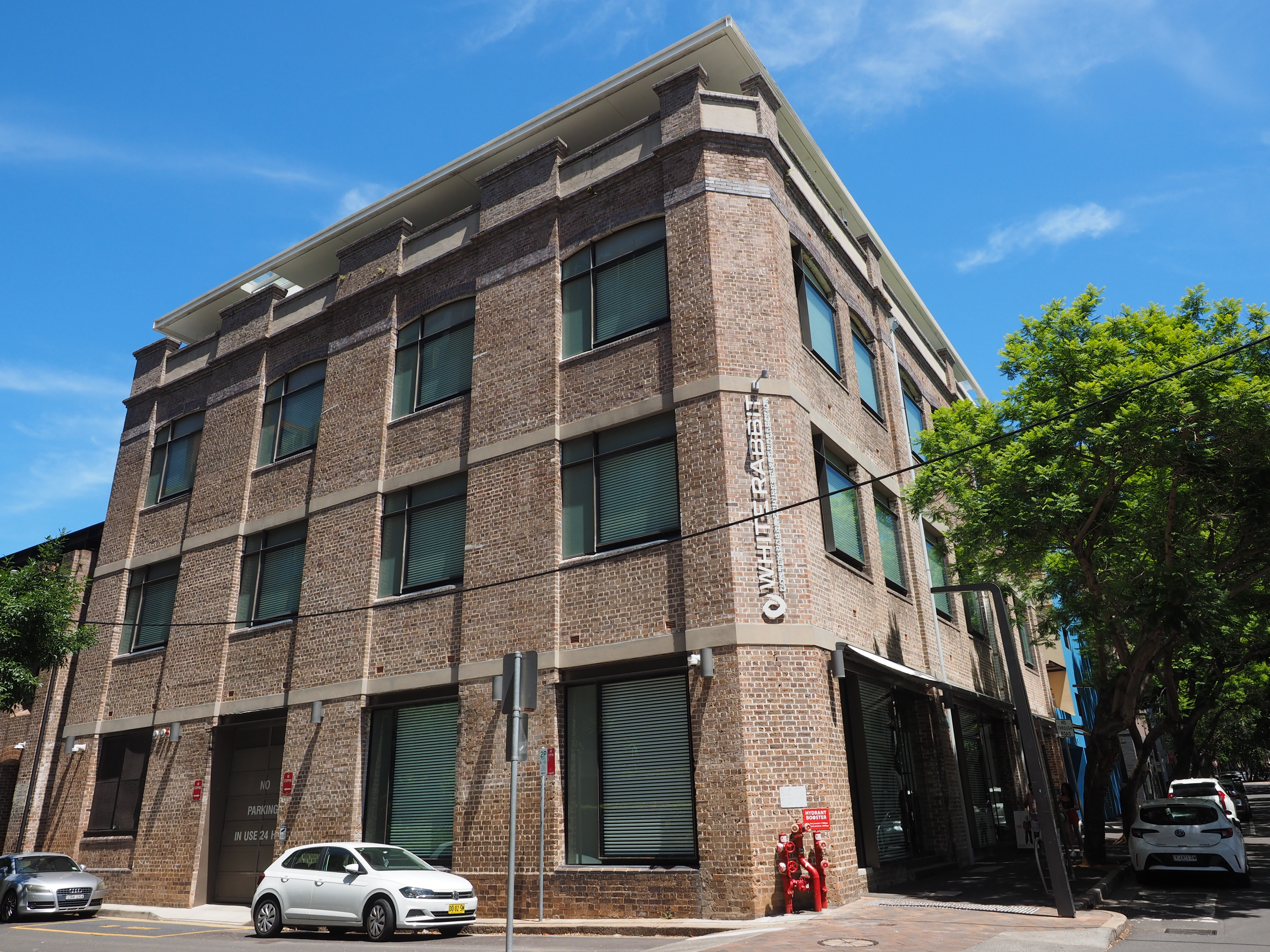
- White Rabbit Gallery exterior

- Location in greater metropolitan Sydney
- Established: 2009; 17 years ago
- Location: 30 Balfour Street, Chippendale, Sydney, New South Wales, Australia
- Coordinates: 33°53′11.5″S 151°12′0.5″E
- Type: Contemporary art museum
- Collections: 21st-century Chinese contemporary art
- Collection size: 2,500 works
- Founder: Judith Neilson
- Owner: Judith Neilson
- Website: www.whiterabbitcollection.org

The White Rabbit Gallery is a contemporary art museum located in the Sydney inner-city suburb of Chippendale, New South Wales, Australia.

== Description ==
The private art museum, which opened in 2009 is owned by Judith Neilson. It is located in a former warehouse and Rolls-Royce service depot, which was refurbished as an art museum, designed by Smart Design Studio. It includes four floors of gallery space, a tea house, digital media theatre, reception, car parking and an artist-in-residence studio.

White Rabbit Gallery holds two exhibitions a year, focusing on works by contemporary Chinese artists. It is considered a dynamic entity that "mirrors the rapidly evolving profile of contemporary Chinese art".

White Rabbit Gallery's collection holds over 3000 artworks by over 800 contemporary Chinese artists all made since the year 2000. The collection has become one of the most significant collections of Chinese contemporary art in the world. The collection contains artworks by leading Chinese contemporary artists including:

- Zhang Peili
- Gu Wenda
- Shi Yong
- Chen Yanyin
- Huang Xialiang
- Yang Shen
- Shang Yang
- Miao Ying
- Zhu Jinshi
- Yu Hong

The White Rabbit Collection is housed in the award winning Dangrove art storage facility in Alexandria, designed by architect Alexander Tzannes.

== Gallery ==
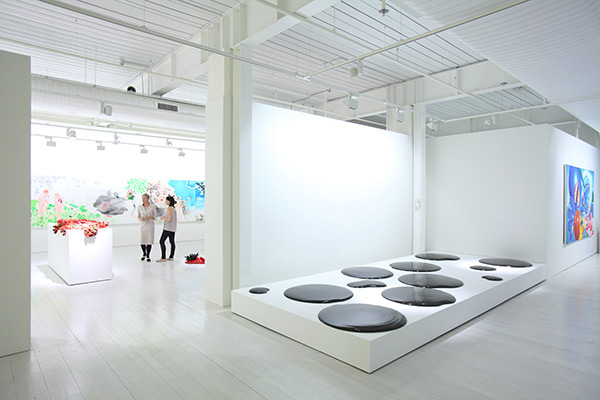
White Rabbit Gallery interior

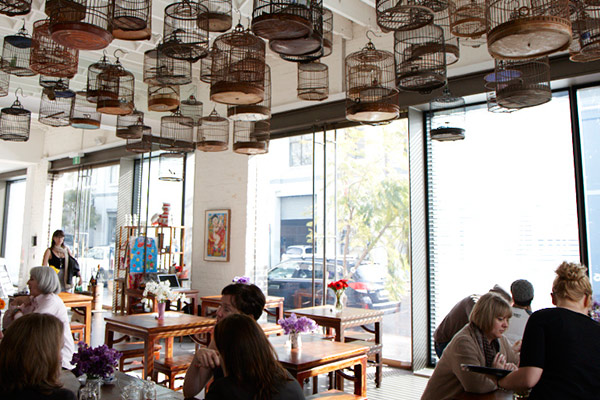
White Rabbit Tea House
