= Judith Neilson =

Zimbabwean-Australian businesswoman and philanthropist

Judith Neilson AM
- Occupations: Businesswoman; Philanthropist
- Known for: White Rabbit Gallery
- Spouse: Kerr Neilson (div. 2015)
- Children: 2

Judith Neilson AM is an Australian businesswoman and philanthropist with a passion for visual arts. Neilson is the founder of the White Rabbit Gallery in Sydney. She is a significant shareholder in Platinum Asset Management, a company co-founded by her former husband, Kerr Neilson.

== Philanthropy ==
Neilson's financial status has supported her philanthropic initiatives, exemplified through the establishment of the A$100 million Judith Neilson Institute for Journalism and Ideas. Situated in Sydney, the institute fosters collaboration with international journalists and media organisations and encourages independent quality journalism. The institute is overseen by a board of directors, international advisory council and staff to manage the programs and operations. In 2015 Neilson endowed a Chair of Architecture at the University of New South Wales to develop housing solutions for displaced individuals, such as climate refugees or those affected by natural disaster or conflict. In 2017, Neilson initiated the Judith Neilson Chair of Contemporary Art at the University of New South Wales in addition to creating a Scholarship in Contemporary Art at the University of Sydney.

Neilson is also the founder of the Neilson Foundation, which sponsors chaitable and development works in Australia and globally.https://www.neilson.org.au/

=== White Rabbit Gallery ===
In 2009, Kerr and Neilson opened the White Rabbit Gallery in Chippendale, Sydney to display their collection of artworks that they have acquired over the previous decades. The gallery showcases and pays particular tribute to 21st century Chinese modern art, as a reflection of Judith's personal inclination towards Asian art culture. This followed Neilson's first trips to Beijing in the late 1990s, where she was exposed to such art. The White Rabbit Gallery is today one of the most significant collections of Chinese contemporary art. Neilson regularly travels to both China and Taiwan to augment the collection that includes more than 2,000 works by almost 700 artists. In 2016 The Art Life list Judith Neilson as one of the 50 most powerful people in Australian art in recognition of her donations, with her former husband, Kerr, to philanthropic art projects since 2007 and the opening of the White Rabbit Gallery. Since 2015, the White Rabbit Gallery has been funded solely by Judith Neilson.

=== Awards and recognition ===
Neilson was appointed a Member of the Order of Australia in 2016 for significant service to the arts through the museums and galleries sector, and as a benefactor of cultural and educational organisations. She was named one of the Australian Financial Review's 100 Women of Influence in 2018.

== Personal life ==
Neilson and her former husband, Kerr, divorced in 2015. They have two children.

=== Net worth ===
Since 2015, and her divorce from her billionaire husband Kerr Neilson, Judith Neilson was included on Forbes’ list of Australian billionaires. Neilson was ranked number 2057 on Forbes’ billionaires list in 2019. In 2020 it was the first year, since 2015, that Neilson was not included on the list. According to the BRW, in 2015 Neilson debuted on the Rich 200 with a net worth of A$1.55 billion. Renamed as the Financial Review Rich List, as of May 2025 Neilson's net worth was assessed as A$1.23 billion. Her former husband's net worth has been reported separately since 2015.

Year	Financial Review Rich List		Forbes Australia's 50 Richest	
Year	Rank	Net worth ($A)	Rank	Net worth ($US)
2015^{[note 1]}		$1.55 billion ▲	not listed	n/a
2016			not listed	n/a
2017		$1.34 billion	26 ▲	
2018	36 ▲	$1.77 billion ▲		
2019	65 ▼	$1.35 billion ▼	37 ▼	$1.02 billion ▲
2020	69 ▼	$1.44 billion ▲		
2021	71 ▼	$1.55 billion ▲		
2022	98 ▼	$1.40 billion ▼		
2023	99 ▼	$1.43 billion ▲		
2024		$1.20 billion ▼		
2025	134	$1.23 billion ▲		

Legend
Icon	Description
Steady	Has not changed from the previous year
▲	Has increased from the previous year
▼	Has decreased from the previous year

Notes

- ^[note 1]: Prior to 2015, net worth was reported in the name of Kerr Neilson only. From 2015, net worth was separated with individual listings for Kerr Neilson and for Judith Neilson.
