= Xiao Yuan =

Chinese forger

- Born: 1957 or 1958 (age 68–69)
- Occupation: Librarian
- Years active: 2004–2006
- Employer: Guangzhou Academy of Fine Arts
- Known for: Art forgery
- Title: Chief Librarian at the Guangzhou Academy of Fine Arts
- Term: 2003–2010
- Criminal charges: Corruption

Xiao Yuan is a Chinese academic and forger who served as the Chief Librarian of the Guangzhou Academy of Fine Arts from 2004 to 2010.

He was tried in 2015 for stealing 143 paintings from the school library and replacing them with forgeries. He sold 125 of the paintings at auction, profiting over 34 million yuan (equivalent to about $6 million United States dollars). Additionally, 11 of the remaining paintings were valued at over 70 million yuan (equivalent to about $11 million United States dollars).

Yuan defended himself by saying that many paintings had already been stolen and forged when he arrived at the university and began digitizing its collection in 2003.
