= Yangjiang Group =

Chinese collective artist group

The Yangjiang Group is a Chinese artist collective founded in 2002 by Zheng Guogu (born 1970), Chen Zaiyan (born 1971), and Sun Qinglin (born 1974). The group's name takes after their hometown in Yangjiang, Guangdong Province. The Yangjiang Group's works have been exhibited in Europe and Asia. Their works show a strong attachment to a sense of place in their hometown.

The group constantly explore the possibilities of calligraphy in modern days, responding to the questions, like "What significance, if any, does calligraphy have in today's society ? ", " Where does calligraphy stand in China today ? "

== Yangjiang group members ==
Everyone in Yangjiang meets each other over dinner gatherings or drinking parties. All three of Yangjiang Group members also met while drinking together. By forming the group, they collaborate. Zheng Guogu is in charge of space, architecture and exhibition design, creating modern space for the works of Chen Zaiyan and Sun Qinglin. Chen Zaiyan majored in calligraphy in an art school in China. He is described as knowledgeable on matters related to Chinese calligraphy. Sun Qinglin handles calligraphy with certain swoops and other strokes. His flexible joints allow him to produce powerful strokes.

== Practice ==
Yangjiang Group is named after the city in China where the three artists are based. Yangjiang is a resort city with significant presence of industrial complexes, but it is located far from the country's political and economic centers. The city is the source of artistic inspiration for the members of Yangjiang Group. They found subject matter for their creative work from the city's background and its local life. When Yangjiang Group transcribes Internet texts, news articles, and titles through calligraphy, the transcription becomes straightforward and hard-hitting commentary on the sociopolitical reality of the Chinese economic miracle. The group also likes to engage the public through participatory performance works that address various themes relating to the new ways and rules of life that have resulted from China's industrialization and the radical liberalization of its market economy. For the Yangjiang Group members, art and life form a single continuum. Therefore, the everyday necessities of life - food, clothing, and shelter, for example - become subject matter for their art.

The collective method of work follows other Chinese art groups such as the Big Tail Elephants. The Yangjiang Group's works are noted for their apolitical content, non-representational method of expression, and unabashed refutation and criticism of political analysis of Chinese contemporary art. Xiao Fengxia attributed the aniconism of their works to a degree of political autonomy from Beijing in Guangdong Province: "Far away from the hierarchal chronotope of Beijing, southern China drifts away from the center…the local people's innovative spirit, lifestyles, and political feelings are unique, and do not completely follow Beijing... Southern China's economic boom, especially in Hong Kong, Shenzhen, and Guangzhou in the Pearl River Delta Region... led to unprecedented growth in prosperity that overturned orthodox Socialist thought".

The Yangjiang Group work primarily with calligraphy, but also other mediums such as video and wax sculpture. The group frequently combines various mediums that engages many different senses, and with special attention to the relationship among the work of art, the audience, and the gallery space. Their works are often done impromptu, to erase the distance between a work of art and the lived experience, where "life itself becomes an integral part of their art".

Their subject matters are not Tang poems by earlier masters, but headlines from newspapers and ordinary events of everyday life.

The Yangjiang Group draws from classical Chinese practice of experiencing works of art where audience participation is essential, as noted by Lisa Catt. The group also addresses the issue of commoditization of art that enables a work of art to take on a new meaning, and lose its ability to dictate culture as a result. The group continue to work in their hometown in Yangjiang, where they promote the local art scenes in southern China to counterbalance the financial potential of contemporary art from Beijing and Shanghai.

== Selected works ==
=== Wax Series ===
The Wax Series comprises Waterfall (2002), Pond (2003) and Garden of Pine – Also Fiercer than Tiger II (2010).

Made almost entirely from wax, Zheng Guogu explained that the dripping movement of wax shows the infinite dimension of physical objects. In addition, the work calls into question the comparative meaning of wax in Chinese and Western culture. The work combines calligraphy written by ordinary people to show the kinetic nature of the art of calligraphy.

=== Yangjiang Group: Actions for Tomorrow ===
Yangjiang Group: Actions for Tomorrow was a show in 4A Centre for Contemporary Asian Art in Chinatown, Sydney, over the period of the 2015 Chinese New Year. Reflecting on the exhibition's content, curator of the centre Melissa Chiu said, "Guangzhou has neither the political centrality of Beijing nor the economic history of Shanghai. Guangzhou's location is determined solely by opportunity for economic prosperity". Works which debuted in this exhibition included:

- Drinking Tea at Work, for which participants are invited to sit down in the space to perform the tea ceremony and savor tea.
- Calligraphy After the Meal. a performance by the artists that utilizes a large sheet spread on the floor. Artists write a long calligraphy inscription in turn. During the performance, the artists engage in conversation that is aestheticized to become part of the "artwork."
- Shang-ti is Dead! Yet, the Yuan is Very Much Alive!; Shang-ti is the Chinese concept of a divine being, which differs from the Western concept of God. The work has been interpreted as revealing the contradiction between the espousal of Socialist values and economic pragmatism in contemporary China. The Yangjiang Group has been vocal that they do not agree with this reading of the work. The Yangjiang Group explains:
  Chinese property buyers poured a large amount of money into Sydney... new changes lead to such conflicts being expressed in this [Australian] society (中国的房地产商带来了大量的资金，涌进了悉尼……新的变化让这种冲突在这个社会里边呈现出来。

=== Calligraphy Is the Way to Communicate with the Most Primal Power ===
"Calligraphy Is the Way to Communicate with the Most Primal Power" was a site-specific work for Korean Air Box Project 2016, which was the annual exhibition held by the National Museum of Modern and Contemporary Art, Seoul at the museum's exhibition space called Seoul Box. Based on their own imagination, Yangjiang Group turned Seoul Box into a modern adaptation of the fabled Peach Blossom Land, an ethereal utopia in a fable by Tao Yuanming, which is a common subject matter of traditional Chinese landscape painting in ink. Works in the space include:

- Social Calligraphy Experiment : A 17-meter high work reinterprets calligraphy as a painting. It was completed on site in a performance with the participation of the public, before the opening of the exhibition
- After Dinner Calligraphy : A digital record of a performance that involves leftover food and calligraphy, which was part of the opening event, with the participation of museum visitors.
- Pond of Letters : A pond of 10 meters in diameter containing ink on thrown-away calligraphy practice papers. This pond reflected the traditional East Asian cosmological concept of "round sky, square earth (天圓地方)". The Pond of Letters was filled with calligraphy written by visitors.

After the opening and during the exhibition, the group held other performance events, including "Tea and Incense Ceremony" during which the artists shared rare Chinese teas and flavors with museum visitors. In the summer of 2017, the members of Yangjiang Group visited Seoul Box again to cover the exhibition space with approximately a ton of paraffin wax.

== Selected exhibitions ==
- 2013-2014: "Fuck off the Rules: Yangjiang Group," Minsheng Art Museum, Shanghai, China. 8 November 2013 - 22 February 2014
- 2015: "Yangjiang Group: Actions for Tomorrow," 4A Centre for Contemporary Asian Art, Sydney, Australia. 17 January – 7 March 2015
- 2016-2017: "Tales of Our Time," Solomon Guggenheim Museum, New York, United States. 4 November 2016 - 10 March 2017
- 2016-2017: "Korean Air Box Project 2016: Yangjiang Group, Calligraphy Is the Way to Communicate with the Most Primal Power", National Museum of Modern and Contemporary Art, Korea. 18 October 2016 - 27 August 2017
- 2025: "鄭國穀/陽江組合：以身探法", 海上世界文化藝術中心L2聯合國教科文組織展館. 2025.7.28-10.26
