= Wang Tiande =

Chinese contemporary artist

Wang Tiande (born 1960, Shanghai) is a contemporary Chinese artist who focuses on calligraphy. He graduated the Chinese Painting Department at the Zhejiang Academy of Fine Arts in 1988, later obtaining his doctoral degree in its calligraphy department. He currently is a professor at Fudan University in Shanghai.

His work is included in the collection of the Metropolitan Museum of Art, the Museum of Fine Arts, Boston and the British Museum.
