= Duan Guangren =

Chinese scientist

- 段广仁
- Born: 1962 (age 63–64); Heilongjiang, China
- Education: Yanshan University; Harbin Engineering University; Harbin Institute of Technology
- Scientific career
- Fields: Control theory
- Workplaces: Harbin Institute of Technology

Chinese name
- Traditional Chinese: 段廣仁
- Simplified Chinese: 段广仁
Transcriptions
Standard Mandarin
- Hanyu Pinyin: Duàn Guǎngrén

Duan Guangren (Chinese: 段广仁; born 1962) is a Chinese scientist specializing in control theory.

== Education ==
Duan was born in Heilongjiang province in 1962. He attended Yanshan University where he received his bachelor's degree in applied mathematics in 1983. After completing his master's degree in modern control theory at Harbin Engineering University, he attended Harbin Institute of Technology where he obtained his doctor's degree in general mechanics in 1989. In October 1989 he was a postdoctoral fellow at Harbin Institute of Technology.

== Career ==
He taught at Harbin Institute of Technology since 1991, what he was promoted to associate professor in August 1991 and to full professor in November 1991. From 1997 to 1998 he was a visiting professor at Hull University and then Sheffield University. He worked at Queen's University Belfast between 1999 and 2002.

== Honours and awards ==
- 1999 National Science Fund for Distinguished Young Scholars
- 2001 Fellow of the Institution of Electrical Engineers (IEE)
- 2008 State Natural Science Award (Second Class)
- 2015 State Natural Science Award (Second Class)
- 2017 Fellow of the Institute of Electrical and Electronics Engineers (IEEE)
- 2018 Fellow of the Chinese Association of Automation (CAA)
- November 22, 2019 Member of the Chinese Academy of Sciences (CAS)
