= Jin Jiangbo =

Chinese artist

Jin Jiangbo (Chinese: 金江波; born 1972 in Zhejiang Province, China) is a contemporary Chinese artist who focuses on site-specific artwork. From 2002 to 2007 he was Digital Art Center Studio Director for the Academy of Fine Arts, Shanghai University.

He has taken part in the Venice Biennale, the Shanghai Biennale, Nanjing Triennial and other international exhibitions. He was the Shanghai Curator of the 1st Beijing International Design Triennial, visiting scholar of Alfred University, United States.

In 1995 he graduated from the Academy of Fine Arts, Shanghai University. In 2002 he received a master's degree in digital art from the Academy of Fine Arts, Shanghai University. In 2012 he earned a PhD in art from the Academy of Fine Arts, Tsinghua University.

According to Gu Zhenqing's article "Light as Fuck" for ShangART:

The true "Shanghai assemblage" could not overlook artists such as Hu Jie Ming, Zhou Hongxiang and Jin Jiangbo. Their work is the pledge for the sustained advancement towards diversity of the Shanghai artists' community... Jin Jiangbo's online interactive multi-media work that linked Shanghai with the outside world – they all contain the essence of experience and spirit of the individual artists, and form an interconnected relationship with the different points of view. This avoids the tendency towards conceptualisation in the "Shanghai assemblage".
