= Duan Jin =

Chinese academic

- 段进
- Born: December 1960 (age 65); Nanjing, Jiangsu, China
- Education: Tianjin University
- Scientific career
- Fields: Urban and rural planning
- Workplaces: Southeast University

Chinese name
- Traditional Chinese: 段進
- Simplified Chinese: 段进
Transcriptions
Standard Mandarin
- Hanyu Pinyin: Duàn Jìn

Duan Jin (Chinese: 段进; born December 1960) is a Chinese planner and professor at Southeast University.

== Education ==
Duan was born in Nanjing, Jiangsu in December 1960. He received his master's degree and doctor's degree from Tianjin University in 1982 and 1985, respectively. He earned his doctor's degree from Southeast University under the direction of Qi Kang.

== Career ==
From September 1990 to January 1992 he was a visiting scholar at KU Leuven. He joined the faculty of Southeast University in April 2003, what he was promoted to deputy dean of its School of Architecture in November 2003 and to director of its Institute of Urban Space in September 2005.

== Honours and awards ==
- 2016 Title of "National Great Engineering Survey Design Master" by the Ministry of Housing and Urban-Rural Development
- November 22, 2019 Member of the Chinese Academy of Sciences (CAS)
