= Yuan Jai =

Yuan Jai (Chinese: 袁旃; born 1941) is a visual artist based in Taiwan. She is known for her experimentation with representation in Chinese ink painting. The artist studied Chinese painting and received her doctorate in Belgium, focusing on the preservation of cultural artifacts. After she returned to Taiwan, she worked as a conservator in the Department of Antiquities at the National Palace Museum in Taipei for more than thirty years. Her artistic career started to flourish as she was surrounded by Chinese old masters' paintings, jades, textiles, and ceramics at the museum. Her work draws from antique prototypes and masters' paintings, and interprets visual traditions by incorporating geometric patterns, vibrant colors, and daily experiences.

== Education ==
Yuan Jai was born in Chongqing, Sichuan. She studied with Chinese Painting maters Pu Xinyu and Huang Yun-bi at the Department of Art, Taiwan Provincial Normal University (now Department of Fine Arts, National Taiwan Normal University), and then moved to Belgium where she received her master's degree in Archeologie et Histoire de l'Art from Université Catholique de Louvain in 1966. In 1968, she received her doctorate from the Institut Royal du Patrimoine Artistique (IRPA) for the Preservation of Cultural Artifacts. Her studies of Art Deco, Art Nouveau, Cubism, and Surrealism have a fundamental influence on her work.

== Works ==
In her work, Yuan uses bright mineral pigments (e.g. malachite powder for green and lapis powder for blue) to depict blue-and-green landscapes. Her visual language integrates forms from China's artistic heritage, European paintings she studied for her doctorate, as well as her personal, daily experiences. She uses elements of classical Chinese arts but does not follow the prescribed rules of this tradition. She interprets Chinese art in a transnational fashion and therefore challenges art historical canons that depend on Euro-American centers. Yuan Jai did not resume her painting practice until her forties. Since picking up her painting brush again in 1987, Yuan Jai has attempted to find innovative methods of Chinese painting by using the tradition as the foundation, and incorporating the skills and concepts she has encountered and absorbed in the course of her multiple life experiences.

== Exhibitions ==
Yuan Jai's recent solo exhibitions include Yuan Jai, Center Pompidou, Paris, 2020; and A Visionary Mind: The Art of Yuan Jai in a Quarter-Century, Kaohsiung Museum of Fine Arts, Kaohsiung, 2012. She also recently participated in the exhibitions The Weight of Lightness: Ink Art at M+, M+ Pavilion, West Kowloon Cultural District, Hong Kong, 2017; Memories Interwoven and Overlapped, Post-Martial Law Era Ink Painting in Taiwan, National Taiwan Museum of Fine Arts, Taichung, 2017; Majestic Island – The Development of Modern Art in Taiwan (1911-2011), The National Art Museum of China, Beijing; China Art Museum, Shanghai, 2012; and Future Pass – From Asia to the World, Collateral Event of the 54th Venice Biennale, Venice, 2011.

== See also ==
- Taiwanese art
