= Platinum Asset Management =

Australian investment management firm

- Type: Public
- Traded as: ASX: PTM; S&P/ASX 300 component
- Industry: Investment management
- Founded: 1994; 32 years ago
- Founders: Kerr Neilson; Andrew Clifford; Elizabeth Norman; Toby Harrop
- Headquarters: 7 Macquarie Place, Sydney, New South Wales, Australia
- Key people: Andrew Clifford (CEO)
- Products: Mutual Fund; Hedge fund Listed investment company UCITS
- Revenue: ▼ A$252.67 million (FY 2022)
- Net income: ▼ A$101.49 million (FY 2022)
- AUM: ▼ A$17 billion (Q3 2022)
- Total assets: ▼ A$349.76 million (FY 2022)
- Total equity: ▼ A$323.56 million (FY 2022)
- Number of employees: 110 (Q2 2021)
- Website: platinum.com.au

Platinum Asset Management Limited is an asset management company that has been publicly traded on the Australian Securities Exchange (ASX) since 2007 and is a constituent member of the S&P/ASX 300 index.

It has two ASX-listed investment companies, Platinum Capital Limited (ASX: PMC) and Platinum Asia Investments Limited (ASX: PAI). In addition, it has three listed funds, Platinum International Fund (ASX: PIXX), Platinum Asia Fund (ASX: PAXX) and Platinum Global Transition Fund (ASX: PGTX).

In 2015, the firm was ranked as the largest hedge fund group in Australia as well as the second largest in Asia-Pacific.

== History ==
In 1994, Platinum Asset Management was founded by Kerr Neilson and several others with the financial backing of George Soros. It was founded as a specialist company in international equities.

The success of the firm was attributed to the ability to transcend short-term market investment and focus on long-term returns; its strongest performance came between 2000 and 2002. In 2007, Platinum went public and was listed on the Australian Securities Exchange under the ticker: 'PTM'.

Poor results during the 2012 financial year resulted in a 16 per cent fall in net profit, mainly due to a 14 per cent reduction in investment income. As a result, Neilsen agreed to forego a performance bonus, an increase in his base salary, and neither granted himself nor exercised options.

In 2018, Neilson stepped down as chief executive officer and was replaced by Andrew Clifford who was another co-founder of the company. In November 2022, Neilson resigned from his position at the company's board of directors although he still remained the company's largest shareholder.

In February 2023, Neilson called for Clifford to resign citing the firm's poor performance and how Clifford shouldn't hold the role of both CEO and CIO simultaneously. In August that year, the board of directors announced that Clifford would step down from his role as CEO once a successor was found although he would remain as CIO.

On 8 September 2023, shares of Platinum Asset Management hit a record low of A$1.335 after more than A$900 million was pulled from its funds in August. According to a report by Barrenjoey Capital Partners, the company was in "severe organic decay".

On October 1, 2025, it was announced that First Maven Pty Ltd. had acquired the company through a reverse merger transaction.

== See also ==
- Navigator Global Investments
