= Duan Tianjie =

Chinese major general

- 段天杰
- Born: Loufan County, Shanxi, China
- Military career
- Allegiance: People's Republic of China
- Branch: People's Liberation Army Ground Force
- Service years: 1976–2015
- Rank: Major general
- Commands: Deputy Director of the Political Department of PLA National Defence University

Duan Tianjie (Chinese: 段天杰; pinyin: Duàn Tiānjié) is a major general in the People's Liberation Army (PLA). He was placed under investigation by PLA's anti-corruption agency in November 2014 and transferred to the military judicial organ in January 2015. Previously he served as deputy director of the Political Department of PLA National Defence University.

Duan Tianjie was also a columnist in Liberation Army Daily (解放军报), and he once served as president of Zhanyou Bao (战友报).
