= Naihua Duan =

Naihua Duan (Chinese: 段乃華; born 31 October 1949) is a Taiwanese biostatistician specializing in mental health services and policy research at Columbia University. Duan is a professor of biostatistics (in psychiatry) with tenure in the Departments of Psychiatry and Biostatistics at Columbia University Medical Center, and a senior research scientist at NYSPI.

== Education and career ==
Duan received a B.S. in mathematics from National Taiwan University, an M.A. in mathematical statistics from Columbia University, and a Ph.D. in statistics from Stanford University.

He is an elected fellow of the American Statistical Association and the Institute of Mathematical Statistics. He has also served as a member of the editorial board for Statistica Sinica and Health Services & Outcomes Research Methodology, and associate editor for the Journal of the American Statistical Association. In addition, he served on a number of national and international panels, such as the Institute of Medicine's Committee on Organ Procurement and Transplantation Policy and Committee on Assessing the Medical Risks of Human Oocyte Donation for Stem Cell Research; the National Research Council's Committee on Carbon Monoxide Episodes in Meteorological and Topological Problems Areas; and the National Institute of Mental Health’s Behavioral Sciences Workgroup.
