= Big Tail Elephant =

Chinese contemporary art collective

Big Tail Elephant was a media art collective from the Guangzhou, China. Consisting of artists Chen Shaoxiong, Liang Juhui, Lin Yilin, and Xu Tan, the group was most active in the 1990s. According to some accounts, they ceased to operate collectively after 1998.

At the time the group operated, the centers for contemporary art in China were Beijing and Shanghai, not the Pearl River Delta area, where the artists lived. Responding in part to the rapid urban development of Southern China following economic growth, the collective organized a series of guerrilla exhibitions in transient or abandoned urban spaces. According to Swiss curator and Art Historian Bernhard Fibicher "The tremendous upheaval in China, reflecting the culture shock provoked by Deng Xiaoping’s reforms, represents the core theme for this group’s artistic projects. Their work deals with the cultural, intellectual, social and political schisms in present day China... Above all, the group seeks to instill confusion between the public and private realms, to doctor "normal" size ratios, and to correlate art with life. In other words, to use all possible means (but preferably those with which we are most familiar) for purposes of destabilization."

They were part of a wave of artists responding to economic and cultural changes in the Pearl River Delta region, including such as Cao Fei. Artist Xu Tan articulated that the group believed in channeling their political and economic critiques into a more local system of art, using savings from other work to create their exhibitions.

Curator Barbara London, who led early video acquisitions at the Museum of Modern Art, included the group in her chronology of the first 50 years of video art.
