= Cao Yong =

Chinese artist

- Born: June 9, 1962 (age 63); Xinxian
- Died: June 25, 2023; Chengdu, China
- Occupation: Artist

Cao Yong (Chinese: 曹勇; born June 9, 1962, in Xinxian, Henan, China) was a Chinese artist whose work depicts Tibet. He spent a year alone in the mountains of Tibet and the paintings he produced were exhibited in Beijing in early 1989. He was subsequently arrested by the Chinese Authorities, with the Beijing Police burning seven of the paintings. He escaped with his fiancée Aya Goda to Japan.

Yong began painting when he was 11 years old. Due to his family background, he was considered politically questionable by the Chinese authorities. He studied for a short period with the noted artist Yu Ren who was staying briefly in Xinxian. He attended Henan University and graduated with a BA in Fine Arts. Following his graduation, he took a position as Assistant Professor of Art at Tibet University. He spent seven years in Tibet and spent a year living alone in mountain caves of Ali, West Tibet, so he could copy the remains of ancient Tibetan wall paintings of the Guge kingdom.

In 1989, he went over to Japan after a private exhibition of Beijing. He continued producing “The Split Layer of Earth – Mount Kailas” series while he was engaged in the wall painting production of the commerce space. The notable work produced aqua fantasy of 60mx 4 m in Yokosuka Daiei in 1991 and produced dragons of 50mx 8 m in Ise Bunkamura in 1993. In 1992, he held a private exhibition in the O ART Museum of Tokyo.

In 1994, Cao went to the United States and held a private exhibition in Synchronicity Space of the New York SOHO. In 1999, he established Cao Yong Editions Inc in LA. In 2002, he produced “Freedom” in the anniversary of 9/11 terrorist incidents. “Free-Freedom” received Artist of the Year 2002, and Cao received an “Outstanding Volunteer” prize and a letter of thanks from the Los Angeles Fire Department (from a total of 118 stations).

Cao produced an oil painting, “We The People”, in commemoration of the Federal Constitution memorial day in 2005. In 2006, he was conferred the “2006 Inspiration Award” from the International Leadership Foundation (ILF).

In 2008, he produced “Voice of the East”. The painting was selected by the Olympic committee to print on china and use as a special gift for the VIPs who attended the Olympics. Cao produced “Love without border” for the Sichuan earthquake.

The Forest Lawn Museum located at the Forest Lawn Memorial Park in Glendale, California has showcased a retrospective of acclaimed Chinese immigrant Cao Yong’s original oil paintings that explore his own, highly personal journey to Tibet, Japan, India, Nepal, China, Cairo, France, Italy and the United States over a 30-year period. "Art Without Boundaries" by Cao Yong, Citizen of the World will be showing from July 27, 2017 - December 14, 2017.

On June 25, 2023, at 1:26 am Yong died in a hospital in Chendu, China at the age of 62, after an unsuccessful medical rescue attempt.
