= Hou Hanru =

Chinese art critic (born 1963)

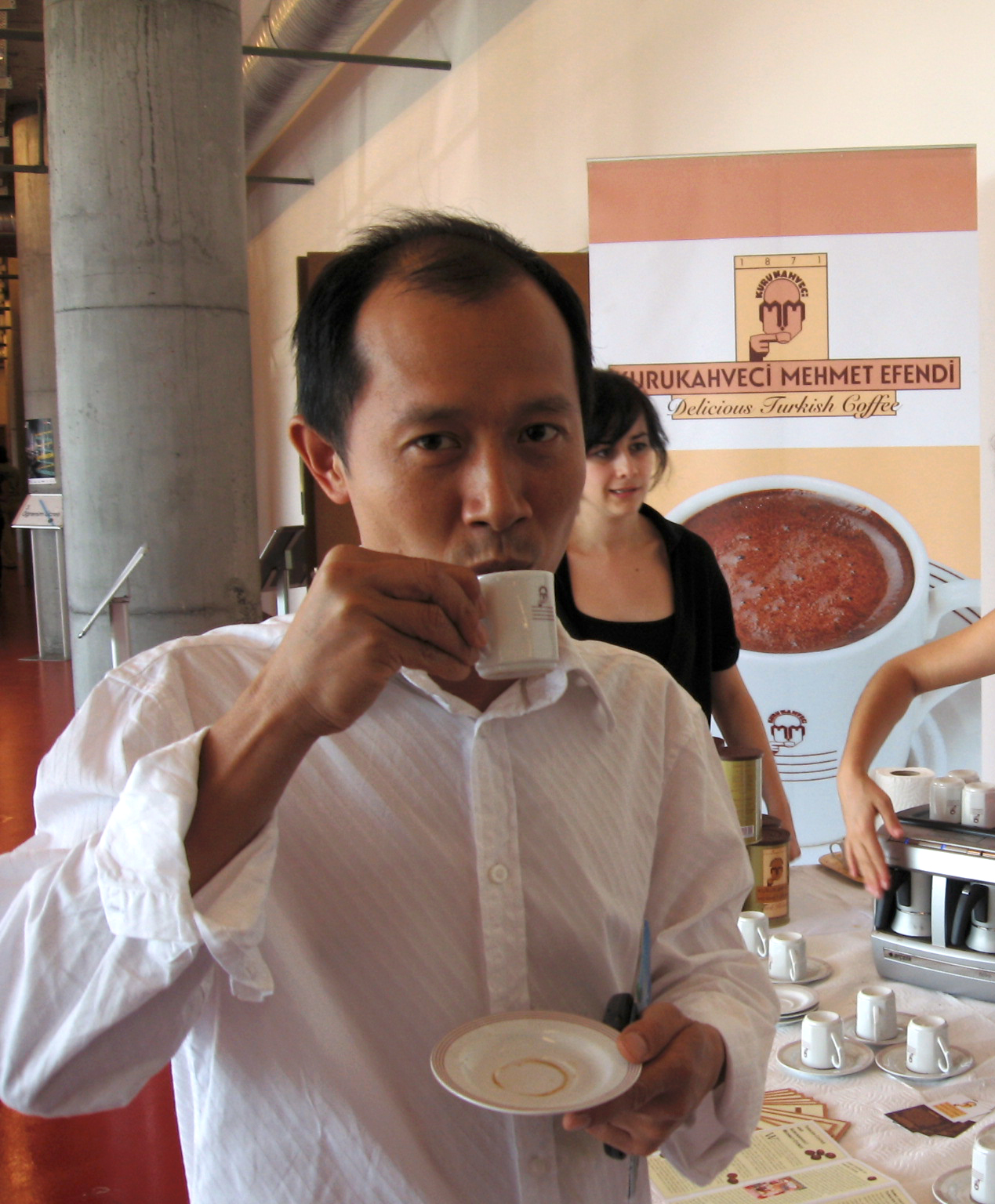
Hou Hanru at the Istanbul Biennial in September 2007

Hou Hanru (Chinese: 侯瀚如; pinyin: Hóu Hànrú; born 1963) is a Chinese-born art curator and art critic. He is based in San Francisco, Paris and Rome. He was artistic director of the National Museum MAXXI in Rome, Italy, from 2013 to 2023.

== Early life and education ==
Hou Hanru was born in 1963, in Guangzhou, China (now People's Republic of China). He graduated from the Central Academy of Fine Arts in Beijing, and moved to Paris in 1990.

== Career ==
Hou lived 16 years in France before moving to the United States in 2006. He worked at San Francisco Art Institute as Director of Exhibitions and Public Program and Chair of Exhibition and Museum Studies from 2006 to 2012. He is artistic director of MAXXI, National Museum of 21st Century Arts, Rome since 2013.

Hou has curated numerous exhibitions including "Cities on the Move" (1997–1999), Shanghai Biennale (2000), Gwangju Biennale (2002), Venice Biennale (French Pavilion, 1999, Z.O.U. -- Zone Of Urgency, 2003, Chinese Pavilion, 2007), Canton Express (2003, Venice), Nuit Blanche (2004, Paris), the 2nd Guangzhou Triennial (2005), the 2nd Tirana Biennial (2005), the 10th Istanbul Biennial (2007), "Global Multitude" (Luxembourg 2007), "Trans(cient)City" (Luxembourg 2007), EV+A 2008 (Limerick), "The Spectacle of the Everyday, The 10th Lyon Biennale" (Lyon, 2009), the 5th Auckland Triennial (Auckland, New Zealand, May - August 2013), etc.

He has been consultant and advisor in many international institutions including Walker Art Center (Minneapolis), Solomon R. Guggenheim Museum (New York), Kumamoto Museum of Contemporary Art (Kumamoto, Japan), De Appel Foundation (Amsterdam), Rockbund Art Museum (Shanghai), Times Museum (Guangzhou), Today Art Museum (Beijing), Power Station of Art (Shanghai), Deutsche Bank Collection (Frankfurt), Kadist Art Foundation (San Francisco/Paris), Asia Art Archive (Hong Kong), etc. and served in juries of many international awards including the Hugo Boss Prize (Guggenheim Museum), Chinese Contemporary Art Award (Beijing), Ars Fennica (Helsinki), Credit Suisse/Today Art Award (Today Art Museum, Beijing) and Hugo Boss Prize China (Rockbund Art Museum, Shanghai).

He has also taught and lectured in various artistic and educational institutions including Rijksakademie van Beeldende Kunsten (Amsterdam), HISk (Antwerp /Ghent), Forecast (Berlin), as well as numerous universities and museums across the world.

A selection of his writings was published as "On The Mid-Ground" by Timezone 8, 2002. His recent books include "Paradigm Shifts, Walter & McBean Galleries exhibitions and public programs, San Francisco Art Institute, 2006-2011", San Francisco Art Institute, 2011 (with Mary Ellyn Johnson). A frequent contributor to conferences, catalogues, magazines and books of contemporary art, he is also a guest editor for international art journals including Flash Art, YIshu, Art Asia Pacific and LEAP.

== Other activities ==
Hou served on the juries that chose Agnieszka Polska as winner of the Preis der Nationalgalerie in 2017 as well as Otobong Nkanga and Petrit Halilaj for the Nasher Prize in 2024 and 2027, respectively.
