= Lin Tianmiao =

Chinese installation artist and textile designer

- 林天苗
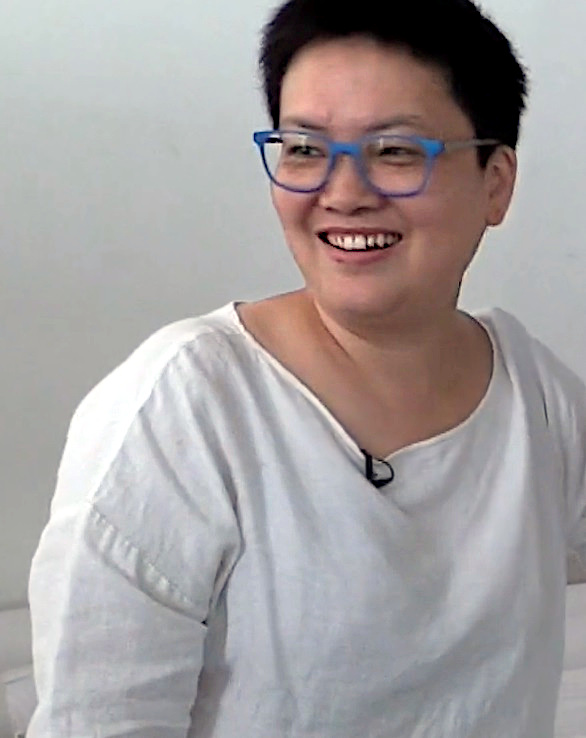
- Lin Tianmiao, studio tour Beijing, July 2015
- Born: 1961 (age 64–65); Taiyuan, Shanxi Province, China
- Known for: sculpture, mixed media
- Website: lintianmiao.com

Lin Tianmiao (Chinese: 林天苗; pinyin: Lín tīan míao; born 1961) is a contemporary Chinese installation artist and textile designer. She sometimes makes use of everyday objects.

== Life ==
Lin Tianmiao was born in 1961 in Taiyuan, Shanxi province, China. Her father was an ink painter and master calligrapher and her mother studied and taught traditional dance. She received a BFA from Capital Normal University in 1961, and later studied at the Art Students League in New York City in 1989.

She lived in Brooklyn from 1988 to 1994. She returned to Beijing in 1995 and converted her home into an open studio which was an important venue for Apartment Art. She is married to Wang Gongxin, who is a video artist, and together they have a son, Shaun. She has said that life's experience is constantly changing, and the way her works are presented is also constantly changing.

== Work ==
Lin started her career as a textile designer and used the skills she had learned in her later work. She changed from textile design to art because she felt like design was limiting her creativity and suppressing her expression. Lin and her husband participated in the Beijing Young Artists' Painting Society, which was contiguous with the '85 Art New Wave Movement. Her work is multifaceted. She sees it as representing both tradition and newness. She co-founded the Loft New Media Art Center in 2001.

In the 1990s Lin created works with materials of contrasting textures, often using undyed cotton thread. She has also worked in other media such as sculpture, photography, video and mixed media. An early work, The Proliferation of Thread Winding (1995), included 20,000 balls of thread attached with needles to a rice paper-covered iron bed. In 2012, she made a series of works using a wooden frame, threads and synthetic bones; Minty Blue (2012) and Duckling Yellow (2012) were two works in the series.

At the 2002 Shanghai Biennale she and her husband collaborated on Here or There; she described the collaboration as "unspeakable", and resolved to "never cooperate anymore." She had a 2006 residency at the Singapore Tyler Print Institute where she experimented with paper media and printmaking. Since the mid-1990s, her works have been included in every major international museum show on Chinese contemporary art.

She had her solo exhibition Gazing Back: The Art of Lin Tianmiao, 對視——林天苗藝術展 as part of the 'Shanghai Pujiang OCT Ten-Year Public Art Project · 2009'. It includes three groups of works, Badges, Advent and Gazing Back, which were all created especially for this public art project.

In 2017, her show at Galerie Lelong in New York exhibited her work Protruding Patterns (2014), which encouraged visitors to walk over her work - an installation made entirely of antique carpets. The carpets were embroidered with dozens of words about women in Chinese, English, French and other tongues - a selection of approximately 2,000 phrases she had collected over a period of more than five years.

=== Feminist themes ===
Lin's work often deals with themes traditionally applicable to women. With its focus on the manifestations of domesticity and motherhood, critics have compared her work to Western feminist art, she has rejected that characterization.

“My art is an expression of my life, as an artist, as a Chinese, and I suppose, as a woman,” she responded to the art world’s routine characterization of her as a “Chinese woman artist.”¹ She uncouples these terms as a reminder to art critics and art historians that her work transcends such an essentializing label. She views that the label feminisim restricts the interpretation of her works, and how she thinks about them.

== List of selected artworks and exhibitions ==
- The Proliferation of Thread Winding, 1995, Asia Society Museum, New York, 2012
- Bound and Unbound, Art Museum of China Central Academy of Fine Arts, Beijing, China, 1997
- Focus on Paper, Singapore Tyler Print Institute, Singapore, 2007
- Mother's!!!, 2008, Asia Society Museum, New York, 2012
- More or Less the Same, 2011, Asia Society Museum, New York, 2012
- Protruding Patterns, 2014, Galerie Lelong & Co, New York, 2017
- Systems, Rockbund Art Museum, Shanghai, China, 2018
