= Lin Yilin =

Chinese performance artist

Lin Yilin (Chinese: 林一林; born 1964) is a Chinese performance artist. Duration and bodily experience are always the key aspects of Lin's practice throughout his career. Through performance, he creates experiences that seem to attempt to overcome the insurmountable, inviting the audience to reflect on current issues in society. His later works focus more directly on exploring the relationship between the body, the setting, and the viewer, even intervening directly in real situations. Although the site and circumstances of a performance are often difficult to control, Lin continues to work against the one-directional relationship between artist and audience.

== Biography ==
Lin was born in Guangzhou, Guangdong, China in 1964. He completed his undergraduate education at Guangzhou Academy of Fine Arts and graduated in 1987. Lin's work is typically site-specific and especially crafted for the place of its performance.

Lin was a core member and co-founder of the Big Tail Elephant Group (formed in 1991), a Guangzhou-based performance and intervention based artist collective with an interest in urban development. His work from this time aims to address the rapid urbanization and economic growth seen in China during the 1990s. Lin used bricks as a motif and sculptural object to further call out these themes. One of his most notable works from this period is Safely Maneuvering across Linhe Road (1995) in which Lin moved a wall of concrete blocks across a busy street in Guangzhou, interrupting the flow of traffic.

In 2001, Lin moved to New York City. As a result his interest in globalization has expanded beyond China. His experience travelling between China and the United States has influenced his art-making, with his attention broadening to encompass current geopolitical affairs.

His practice continues to be centered on performance. His 2018 three-part work Monad, commissioned for the Solomon R. Guggenheim Museum's permanent collection, through VR, allows viewers to inhabit NBA player Jeremy Lin. Lin attributes Jeremy Lin as being a "key figure in representations of race."

Lin now divides his time between New York and Beijing.

== Selected works ==
"Safely Manoeuvring across Linhe Road" (1995) : This approximately thirty-minute video highlights the ninety-minute performance, during which Lin moved a wall of around fifty bricks by stacking and re-stacking them, 'safely manoeuvring' across the thoroughfare. Linhe Road was in the heart of Guangzhou's then new commercial centre and the main artery connecting to Guangzhou East Railway Station. Disruption of traffic there would draw government attention and would pose danger to the artist. Automobiles were forced to slow down as they approached the wall, which prompted curious construction workers and others who were speeding ahead to stop and look. Lin put prolonged physical exertion and heavy labour on display, temporarily halting and interfering with the pace of the development and offering a horizontal slowness in response to rapid verticalisation. Bricks were a common building materials in 1990s Guangzhou and were available in seemingly infinite quantities. His use of bricks invites viewers to make an immediate connection between the performance and their surroundings. The wall, a fundamental element of architecture, is a metaphor for change and for the life of the city.

"Driver" (1996) : A four-day performance during which Lin moved bricks on an elevated walkway near the Hong Kong Arts Centre. The names of Hong Kong political organisations, government agencies, and community offices were written on both sides of the wall, and allusion to the fact that, in post-handover Hong Kong, these groups would merge with one another. However, this work was taken down after passerby complained to the Highways Department.

"Shark-Proof Web" (1997) : Lin disassembled a copy of Hong Kong's Basic Law and scattered the sheets of paper on the surface of a pool in Victoria Park. He then floated in the pool. Named after the nets that protect swimmers from sharks in the waters around Hong Kong, this performance is a metaphor for the future under the Basic Law, and an invitation to the viewer to imagine the accompanying uncertainty.

"A Kind of Machine Called Liberation" (2003) : A performance in New York, Lin laid flat on the ground with his leg trapped underneath a circular structure made of bricks. A man rode a child's bicycle around the bricks. The structure collapsed, but Lin's collaborator continued to cycle over the rubble, on the artist body. The work satirises the American "liberation" of Iraq and the destruction caused by the ongoing urban warfare, presenting it as a childish game.

"8 Minutes" (2008) : One evening in 2007, Lin was shooting a video of the army recruiting station at New York's Times Square, when suddenly several police cars rushed into the square. Lin continued filming for eight minutes. Only several months later he learnt about that evening's event (an attack against the recruiting station). Lin's video shows the filmed scene without modification: the police cars with their sirens going, passers-by paying little attention to the whole scene, and the recruiting station with a huge video screen showing a propaganda film, urging young people to join the army. The breach between the reality simulated in the suggestive images of the army propaganda and the actuality of the news event once again revealed to the artist the efficiency of those structures constituting consciousness, reminding him on his childhood education.

"Glorious & Great" (2008) : The video showed Lin as superhero. Filmed from below, Lin's extraordinary self-portrait appears gigantic and overwhelming. Lin, the superhero, is moving ahead, accompanied by a cheerful crowd, Disney-style music and fireworks. The future lies ahead, glorious and great. Yet the hero's figure is gradually fading, and his image become increasingly blurred with every step, making him a kind of phantom, haunting the public's dreams and minds throughout history.

"Typhoon" (2019) : Lin dressed in white pyjamas, walked slowly on metal stilts, which are commonly used by American workers, down a Guangzhou street in the middle of the night, the period during which had less chance of being interrupted by government officials. He walked through the arcades in front of the street-level shops attached to Guangzhou's distinctive colonial-era buildings. Having grown up among this nineteen-century architecture, Lin laments its demolition in the latest round of urban renewal. Evoking a surreal feeling of walking above the ground, the work reflected the helplessness of the individual against the tide of urban development.
