= Chen Yanyin =

Chinese sculptor (born 1958)

- 陈妍音
- Born: 3 October 1958 (age 67); Shanghai, China
- Education: Sculpture, China Academy of Art, Shanghai
- Known for: Sculpture

Chen Yanyin (or Chen Yan Yin 陈妍音) (born 1958) is a Chinese sculptor whose work was featured in the Chinese Fine Arts Chronicle, 2008. Her work was also part of "Between Ego and Society: An Exhibition of Contemporary Female Artists in China" at the Chicago Cultural Center.

== Biography ==
Chen Yanyin was born on 3 October 1958 in Shanghai, China. She attended the Zhejiang Academy of Fine Arts (now known as China Academy of Art) and graduated with a degree in fine arts from the sculpture department in 1988. In 2000 she completed a master's degree at the University of Sydney, Australia.

Chen had her first solo show, Box Series in 1994 at the Shanghai Oil Painting and Sculpture Institute and that same year also did her first collaborative show with Geng Jianyi 耿建翌, Shi Yong 施勇, and Yang Zhenzhong 杨振中 called The Date 26 November 1994 as a Reason. She has done many collaborative shows at galleries throughout the world including Bonn Women's Museum; Chasse Kazerne Fundament Foundation in Breda The Netherlands; the Chicago Cultural Center; grunt gallery in Vancouver, British Columbia, Canada; Heyang Art Museum in Datong, China; Mo Space in Zhenzhou, China; Queensland Art Gallery, Taipei Fine Arts Museum, and numerous locations in her hometown of Shanghai. Her second solo show was entitled Diary and was held in Sydney.

Her work has been featured in many publications Art and Asia Pacific Journal (1994, 1995, and 1997), Contemporary Chinese Art Criticism Series: A Study on Women's Art in China (1999), The State of Chinese Avant-Garde Art: A Compilation of Interviews on Chinese Avant-Garde Art (2002), China Avant-Garde Art 1979–2004 (2006), as well as a significant number of exhibition catalogs.

== Selected works ==
- Northerner in Shanghai 5-B (1999).
- Parents repose high hopes in their children A (2000)
- Acrobatics B (2000)
- Shadow A-B (2000)
- Public Telephone 5-D (2000)
- Bus No. 21 (2006)
- 3 Girls in the Subway (2007)
- Take a Lift (2010)
