= Gao Minglu =

Chinese art scholar (born 1949)

- 高名潞
- Born: 29 October 1949 (age 76)
- Education: PhD, Harvard University
- Known for: The founder of the Chinese avant-garde movement and genre

Gao Minglu (born 29 October 1949) is a scholar in Chinese contemporary art. He is the Chair of the Department of Art History, Professor for Distinguished Service, and Chair of Art and is an instructor at the University of Pittsburgh. He is also distinguished professor at Tianjin Academy of Fine Arts.

Gao was the Chair of the Department of Art History and Professor for Distinguished Service at Sichuan Fine Art Institute, China. His works focus on the influence and nature of Chinese art.

== Early life and education ==
Minglu was born in Tianjin, China in October 1949. One of his exhibitions in China was shut down by the Chinese government in 1989 after only a few hours.

Minglu graduated from the China National Academy of Art. In the same year he worked as an editor of one of China’s art magazines. Minglu serves as professor, artist, curator and art critic. During the cultural revolution "Up to the Mountains and Down to the Countryside Movement" he traveled to Inner Mongolia and worked as a herdsman for five years. After the Cultural Revolution, he attended the Tianjin Academy of Fine Arts to study art history. In 1982 he attended the Graduate School of Chinese Art Research Institute where he received his master's degree. From 1984–1989 he was the editor of "Art" magazine. While there, he regularly wrote about Chinese Art news. He was forced to study Marxism–Leninism in China from 1989–1991.

He planned a Chinese avant-garde art exhibition entitled "Inside Out: New Chinese from 1995 to 1998". During the same time He was showing his work in the "Global Concept Art Exhibition from 1950s to 1980s". He also participated in the exhibition of the "Global Concept Art Exhibition from 1950s to 1980s". In 1999 he showed his work in the "Five Continents and a City" exhibition in Mexico in and was one of the curators from China. During this same time, Minglu wrote an English monograph describing the exhibitions. He wrote other papers on Chinese art.

Gao was awarded the American Academy of Sciences "American Academic Exchange Committee" postdoctoral project scholarship in 1991. This allowed him to come to the US to research and study at Ohio University and Harvard University. He received his doctorate in the history of art research. He graduated from Harvard University.

== Exhibitions ==
During this same time his criticism research and criticism perspectives focused on the present and contemporary art of China, Taiwan and Hong Kong. These studies included comparative research on modernism and avant-garde in China and the West. His work has been shown in a number of shows and exhibitions that include:

- "Chinese Apartment Art: Primary Documents from the Gao Minglu Archive, 1970s–90s," an exhibition at the Frick Fine Arts Building, University of Pittsburgh opened on November 17, 2016.
- “The Lonely Horizon—Gao Minglu during the 1970s” was an exhibition at the Linda Gallery, in Beijing's 798 Art District in June 2015.
- "The Wall: Reshaping Contemporary Chinese Art" organized by the Albright-Knox Art Gallery, the China Millennium Monument Museum in Beijing (CMMM) and the University at Buffalo Art Galleries, 2005.
- "Ink Space," the first section of the 2004 Shenzhen International Ink Biennial Exhibition, 2004.
- "Chinese Maximalism," co-organized by University at Buffalo Gallery and the China Millennium Monument Museum, Beijing, 2003.
- "Harvest: Contemporary Art" (fengshou dangdai yishu zhan), The National Agricultural Museum, 2002.
- Conceptual Art: Point of Origin 1950s–1980s sponsored by Queens Museum, 1999.
- Insideout: New Chinese Art, the Asia Society and San Francisco MOMA, 1998.
- "Fragmented Memory: The Chinese Avant-Garde", Wexner Center for the Arts, the Ohio State University, 1993.
- "China/Avant-Garde Exhibition", National Art Gallery, Beijing, 1989.

== Writings ==
He has authored papers and books. Some titles include:

- History of Contemporary Chinese Art 1985–1986 (Gao Minglu el), (Shanghai: Shanghai Peoples Press, 1990)
- Fragmented Memory: The Chinese Avant-Garde in Exile co-ed with Julie Andrews. (The Wexner Center for the Arts, 1993)
- Inside Out: New Chinese Art ed. (University of California Press, 1998)
- "Extensionality and Intentionality in a Transnational Cultural System" in Art Journal Winter 1998
- "Conceptual Art with Anti-conceptual Attitude" in Global Conceptualism: the Point of Origin 1950s–1980s(Seattle: University of Washington Press, 1999)
- A Century’s Utopia: Chinese Avant-Garde Art (Taiwan: Artists Publishing House, 2000);
- Chinese Maximalism (Chongqing: Chongqing People’s press, 2003)
- "Seeking a Model of Universalism: The United Nations Series and other Works," in Wenda Gu: Art from Middle Kingdom to Biological millennium (Cambridge MA: MIT Press, 2003) pp. 20–29
- The Art and Methodology of Xu Bing (Taipei: The Elite Corporation, 2003). In Chinese and English
- The Wall: Reshaping Contemporary Chinese Art (New York and Beijing: The Albright Knox Art Gallery and China Millennium Museum of Art, 2005)
- The No Name: A History of A Self-Extled Avant-Garde (Beijing: Guangxi Normal University Press, 2007)
- Total Modernity and the Avant-Garde in Twentieth-Century Chinese Art (MIT Press, 2011)
- Theory of Western Art History: Representationalism and the Turn of Art History (Peking University Press, 2016)
- Criteria, Method, Context (Central Compilation & Translation Press, 2016)

== Avant-guarde contributions ==
During his time as editor of "Art" Magazine, Gao was heavily involved in the Chinese 85 New Wave art movement. He acted as the planner, curator, and critic. He directed the 1989 "China/Avant-Garde Exhibition", the first and only large gathering of avant-garde artists at the National Art Museum of China, as well as other avant-garde art exhibits.

== Archivist ==
The University of Pittsburgh University Library System holds Minglu's extensive archive of Chinese contemporary art, manuscripts, paintings, slides, posters, recording materials.
