= Chen Shaoxiong =

Chinese artist

Chen Shaoxiong (1962 – 26 November 2016) was an artist living and working in Beijing, China. Chen Shaoxing worked across mediums including paint, photography, and collage, though he has become increasingly focused on the combination of ink, video, and installation.

== Early life ==
Chen Shaoxiong was born in 1962 in Shantou, a city in the eastern part of Guangdong province. Chen Shaoxiong graduated from Guangzhou Fine Art Academy in 1984, trained in Chinese ink. In 1990, he was a founder of conceptual art group Big Tail Elephant Group with Lin Yilin, Liang Juhui, and Xu Tan.

== Artist profile ==
Chen belongs to a generation of Chinese artists who grew up during a period of significant political, socio-economic and cultural change in China, when information and images were routinely suppressed and restricted, and when distinctions between fact and fiction were blurred. Perhaps because of this experience, Chen is acutely conscious and skeptical of the ways in which history is misread and misrepresented, stating that even today "in our education, history is deliberately misinterpreted, randomly deleted and repeatedly distorted". Although his works are politically engaged, Chen refrains from making bold political statements, preferring a more multi-layered and open-ended approach, which he is able to achieve through the moving image.

== Ink History ==
Ink History (2010) visually chronicles China's history, from the fall of the Qing dynasty in 1911 to the beginning of the twenty-first century with images of the last Emperor, Japanese military presence, the Long March, and Mao Zedong announcing the People's Republic of China, among others. Carefully selected and sparingly released at a time when all media were under Party control, these pictures became iconic—saturated with political meanings as well as personal memories. Ink History explores the relationship between personal and collective memory within the context of China's historical trajectory. The work is accompanied by a soundtrack of well known propaganda songs, historical speeches and the relentless ticking of a clock. Whether it represents a clock or a time bomb is for viewers to decide.

== Death ==
Chen Shaoxiong died on 26 November 2016, at age 54.

== Exhibitions ==
Chen Shaoxing's work is currently on at the Solomon R. Guggenheim Museum in New York as part of Tales of Our Time, an exhibition that features newly commissioned artworks from Greater China.

== Collections ==
Chen Shaoxing's work is a number of major collections including the Solomon R. Guggenheim Museum, Museum of Modern Art, Seattle Art Museum, M+, Victoria and Albert Museum, and the Uli Sigg collection in Switzerland among others.
