= Guangzhou Academy of Fine Arts =

Public fine arts university in Guangzhou, China

- 广州美术学院 (Chinese)
- Former names: Central South China Fine Arts School; South China Literature & Arts College; Central South China Literature & Arts Institute
- Type: Public university
- Established: 1953; 73 years ago
- Students: 7,600
- Undergraduates: 5,127
- Postgraduates: 522
- Location: Guangzhou, Guangdong, China
- Website: http://www.gzarts.edu.cn/

Chinese name
- Simplified Chinese: 广州美术学院
- Traditional Chinese: 廣州美術學院
Transcriptions
Standard Mandarin
- Hanyu Pinyin: Guǎngzhōu Měishù Xuéyuàn
Yue: Cantonese
- Jyutping: gwong2 zau1 mei5 seot6 hok6 jyun6*2

The Guangzhou Academy of Fine Arts (GAFA; Chinese: 广州美术学院; also known as Guangzhou Institute of Fine Arts) is a Chinese national university based in Guangzhou which provides doctoral, master and bachelor's degrees in fine arts and design. It is the only fine arts institution of higher learning in Guangdong Province and even in South China, and one of the eight major fine arts academies in China, with 12 colleges and one affiliated secondary fine arts school, and the existing Changgang campus, University Town campus and Foshan campus, with nearly 10,000 students of all kinds.

== History ==
Guangzhou Academy of Fine Arts established in 1953 as the Central South China Fine Arts School, which consisted of the South China Literature & Arts College, Central South China Literature & Arts Institute and the Fine Arts Department of Guangxi Art Institute.

It was initially based in Wuchang, Hubei Province, and then relocated to Guangzhou and renamed the Guangzhou Academy of Fine Arts in 1958. The undergraduate course was offered in 1958 and the postgraduate courses were subsequently offered in 1978. The postgraduate M.F.A. degree course was established in 1982. GAFA is one of the first authorised institutions to award M.F.A degrees in the whole of China. In 1986 it started to enroll students from foreign countries and overseas Chinese students and students from Hong Kong, Macao and Taiwan. In 2005, it was one of the first academies in China to offer the Master of Fine Arts. In 2010, it was named a candidate for a PhD program by Guangdong Provincial Department of Education.

== Predecessor ==
=== Guangdong Provincial Art College ===
- In April 1940, the Guangdong authorities set up the Guangdong Wartime Art Institute (later renamed Guangdong Museum of Art) in Tangwan, Qujiang County, Shaoguan City, in order to train the backbone of Anti-Japanese War propaganda. The students were admitted by organs, organizations and schools after examination, and the semester was set up for three months to six months. The curator was Huang Linshu, Director of the Provincial Education Department, Hu Gentian served as teaching director and director of the Fine Arts Department, and later Wu Zifu served as director of fine arts. In 1941, in order to cater to the government's design school system, it was renamed Guangdong Provincial Art College, with Zhao Rulin as its president. Due to the frequent bombing by enemy aircraft, the school has passed through Lian County, Shangyao, Luoding and other places since its founding before liberation in 1945, and is known as "three changing school names and ten moving school sites" [1].
- The academy consists of School of Traditional Chinese Painting, School of Fine Arts, School of Architecture and Allied Arts, School of Industrial Design, School of Visual Communication and Media Design, School of Art Education, School of Arts and Humanities, College of Continuing Education, and Section of Political Science.

=== Guangzhou City Art College ===
The school was founded by Gao Jianfu at the command of the Guangzhou Municipal Government, and in early 1947, it was established in Yuexiu Mountain Zhenhai Building and later moved to Haizhu North Road. There are Chinese painting and Western painting groups in the undergraduate section and art and music groups in the Art Normal section. According to the time, there are about 100 students.

=== Central South Academy of Fine Arts ===
- In December 1949, under the leadership of the Guangzhou Military Commission, the provincial and Municipal Arts colleges were taken over and merged, and then reorganized by the South China Literary Association into the South China People's Academy of Literature and Arts.
- In the autumn of 1953, South China People's College of Literature and Art (Department of Fine Arts), Central South College of Arts and Arts (Department of Fine Arts) and Guangxi Arts University(Department of Fine Arts) were transformed into Central South Academy of Fine Arts, located in Wuchang, Hubei Province.
- In 1958, the University moved back to Guangzhou. In August of the same year, it was renamed Guangzhou Academy of Fine Arts and began to enroll undergraduates.

=== Guangdong People's Art Institute ===
- In 1969, Guangzhou Academy of Fine Arts, Guangzhou Music College and Guangdong Dance School merged to form Guangdong People's Academy of Arts.
- In February 1978, the original system of Guangzhou Academy of Fine Arts was restored and graduate students were recruited from all over the country.
- In 1982, it had the right to grant master's degrees, and was one of the first units in China to obtain the right to grant master's degrees.
- In 1986, continuing education students were admitted. In 1998, the Design Branch was formed by various design departments and majors, and it was renamed "School of Design" in 2004. In 1999, the self-study examination counseling center for college and undergraduate art majors was established. A branch of Continuing Education was established in 2002 and renamed "College of Continuing Education" in 2004. In 2014, the "College of Continuing Education" was renamed "City College". In 2004, it began to hold postgraduate courses. In 2004, Guangdong Provincial Department of Education approved Guangmei to become a primary and secondary school art teacher training base.

== Faculty setting ==
- Academy of Chinese Painting:
- Major of Chinese painting
- Mural painting specialty
- Calligraphy and seal cutting major
- School of Painting Art:
- Oil painting major
- Printmaking specialty
- School of Sculpture and Public Art:
- Sculpture major
- Public art major
- School of Intermedia Arts:
- Experimental art major
- School of Industrial Design:
- Industrial design major
- Furniture art design major
- Fashion design major
- Design arts major
- Dyeing and weaving art design major
- School of Visual Arts and Design:
- Visual communication design
- Animation major
- Digital media art design major
- Book binding art major
- Illustration major
- School of Architectural Art and Design:
- Environmental art design major
- Art Deco design major
- Landscape architecture (Landscape design) major
- Architecture (architectural design) major
- School of Fine Arts Education:
- Art education major
- Painting (watercolor) major
- Exhibition design major
- Exhibition design major
- Comprehensive fine arts (painting) major
- Photography (photography and digital art)
- Fine Arts (Art)
- College of Arts and Humanities:
- Department of art history
- Fine Arts (Arts)
- Department of Arts Management
- City College:
- Visual Communication Design (Multimedia direction)
- Visual Communication Design (Book binding direction)
- Environmental art design
- Animation Design (Digital Media Art)
- Painting (oil painting)
- Painting (Chinese Painting)
- Painting (Sculpture)
- Fashion design

== Student Population ==
There is a total student population of more than 7,600 and consists of

- 5,127 regular undergraduate students
- 462 full-time graduate students
- 60 serving graduate students
- 1,960 students of adult education

== Campus ==
The academy consists of Changgang Campus and University Town Campus and occupies an area of 564 mu (92.9 acres) and the floor space totals 362,500 square meters. The library contains art books, journals, replicas, rubbings of ancient bronze and stone carvings, and rare thread-bound Chinese books. It has a collection of more than 400,000 books, 157,000 electronic books, and 15 databases. The school has three galleries totalling 2,000 meters and a sculpture exhibition occupying 1,015 square meters. The library contains more than 10,000 pieces of rare works of art dating back to the Tang dynasty and includes modern works.

== Controversy ==
On Monday, July 20, 2015, the curator/chief librarian of the academy, Xiao Yuan, was charged with corruption. He swapped the landscapes and calligraphies of 17th and 20th-century Chinese artists, namely Zhang Daqian, Qi Baishi, and Zhu Da, with his own forgeries. He chose the easier works of art that were capable of being forged over a weekend and avoided the well-known pieces. From between 2004 and 2006, Xiao Yuan removed 143 paintings and auctioned 125 of them, earning him 34 million yuan (US$5.48 million). China Guardian and Zhejiang Yitong, both auction houses, were mentioned in court as having played a role in the selling of the artwork though none were accused of wrongdoing.
