= Performance art in China =

Performance art in China has grown since the 1970s as a response to the very traditional nature of Chinese state-run art schools. It has become more popular in spite of the fact that it is currently outlawed. In 1999, the importance of contemporary Chinese art was recognized by the inclusion of 19 contemporary Chinese artists in the Venice Biennale. In recent years, many of these artists have made performances specifically for photography or film.

== Examples ==
Some of the more extreme examples of Chinese performance art have become notorious in the West. In 2000, Zhu Yu, a painter and performance artist from Cheng Du, created a scandal by taking a number of photographs of himself, supposedly eating a fetus as a protest against state abortions as a means of population control. Peng Yu and Sun Yuan have also worked with human body parts as well as with live animals and are equally notorious. Some younger performance artists who have exhibited widely in the west in 2005-6 are Shu Yang, the organiser of the Dadao Live Art Festival in Beijing, Yang Zhichao, famous for having his identity card number branded on his back and Wang Chuyu who went on hunger strike as part of an exhibition called Fuck Off that took place in Shanghai in 2000 in opposition to the Shanghai Biennale. They acknowledge a debt to older performance artist and curator Ai Weiwei. Other well-known artists are Ma Liuming, Zhu Ming, and He Yunchang.

The 1996 film Frozen (Chinese title: Jidu Hanleng; 极度寒冷) by Chinese director Wang Xiaoshuai, made under the pseudonym Wu Ming, has as its protagonists a group of Chinese performance artists, who are shown engaging in several street performances in the film.

In 2025, a student in Shanghai University named Kong Junyou used a commercially available “universal key” to shut down more than 100 advertising screens in residential elevators over a five-day period, filming the action and publishing it online. He told Sixth Tone that the project was coursework presented in the form of performance art, intended to protest intrusive advertising noise while provoking public discussion rather than damaging the screens.

== Chinese performance artists ==
- Ai Weiwei
- Chen Shaoxiong
- He Yunchang
- Kong Junyou
- Ma Liuming
- Sun Yuan & Peng Yu
- Shu Yang
- Wang Chuyu
- Wang Xiaoshuai
- Yang Zhichao
- Yuan Cai and Jian Jun Xi
- Xie Deqing
- Zheng Lianjie
- Zhu Yu
- Zhang Huan
- Zhang Shengquan
- Zhou Chengzhou

== Chinese performance artist collectives ==
- Concept 21

== List of performing art ==
- Chinese martial arts
- Chinese variety art
- Dance in China
- Chinese traditional music
- Dragon dance
- Lion dance
