= André Éric Létourneau =

Canadian composer and sound artist (born 1953)

- Born: September 25, 1967 (age 59); Montreal, Quebec, Canada
- Education: Université du Québec à Montréal; Université de Montréal; Artez
- Scientific career
- Fields: Art; Experimental music Media studies Sociology
- Workplaces: Université du Québec à Montréal; Université du Québec à Chicoutimi; National University of Colombia; Hexagram - Centre interuniversitaire en arts médiatiques Institut supérieur des beaux-arts de Besançon Franche-Comté
- Musical career
- Also known as: algojo)(algojo Akunniq
- Genre: Experimental
- Years active: 1986 – Present
- Labels: What Next? Recordings; Inter/Le Lieu; Avatar Records; PPT\Stembogen (Paris)

André Éric Létourneau is a French Canadian media and transmedia artist, researcher, author, musician, composer, curator and professor based primarily in Montreal and Saint-Alponse-Rodriguez, Québec, Canada. He uses several pseudonyms, most notably Benjamin Muon and algojo)(algojo. His work has been associated with the development of performance art, radio art, process art, sound poetry and experimental music. Since the 1980s, Létourneau has presented intermedia works in international performance art festivals, galleries and museums such as the Walter Phillips Gallery at the Banff Centre (1992), The James H.W. Thompson Foundation in Bangkok (one of Thailand's National Museums directed under the Patronage of Her Royal Highness Princess Maha Chakri Sirindhorn, 2006) and at the Pointe-à-Callière Museum (as part of Les Escales Improbables in Montréal, 2007). In 2006, he was one of the artists selected to represent Canada at the XVth Biennale de Paris under a pseudonym. Since 2012, Létourneau has also contributed to the Biennale des Arts d'Afrique de l'est in Bujumbura (EASTAFAB-BURUNDI), the InterAzioni festival in Italy, the Steirischer Herbst in Graz, Austria, Festival Phénomena in Montreal, Grace Exhibition Space, and The Emily Harvey Foundation in New York.

Létourneau produced several radio art projects and music compositions for the Canadian Broadcasting Corporation (CBC). In 1999, he was the producer for the CBC of the special Hörspiel broadcast from 10 to 12 PM on the night of December 31 for the passage to the new millennium. Another Hörspeil, "Standard III" (2002), was commissioned by the CBC and broadcast on the night of Easter Sunday in 2003 under a program developed and curated by Mario Gauthier and Hélène Prévost. He received several grants and awards including grants from the Artists and Community Collaboration Program (ACCP), the Inter-Arts Program of the Canada Council for the Arts and from the Conseil des arts et des lettres du Québec for his artistic and curatorial work.

== Experimental music and radio-art ==
As a music composer and radio artist, Létourneau's works are influenced by the principle of indeterminacy in music, chance music, intuitive music, noise music, sound poetry, text-sound composition, spectral music, non-standard use of musical instruments, traditional music from different cultures (especially Balinese gamelan), by the use of different systems of tuning involving the use of microtones which incorporate electronics and extended techniques. He also regularly constructs his own instruments and custom-built electronics.

He qualifies most of his works as site-specific (pieces to be performed or installed in a precise place) but also "time-specific" (pieces to be performed at specific time of the day or of the year). Since 1999, Létourneau has also involved himself with music composition and interpretation and as the creator of custom-made instruments which are used in his work with the sound performance trio mineminemine along with intermedia artists Magali Babin and Alexandre Saint-Onge. The group regularly presents mineminemine's work in America and Europe.

Since the mid-eighties, Létourneau has also performed works from other experimental music composers such as Alvin Lucier, John Cage and I Wayan Suweca. In 2000, he conducted a radio performance of the Symphony No. 5 by the Korean composer Nam June Paik for the CBC radio.

As a musician, he has collaborated with other composers including Sam Shalabi (Shalabi Effect), Roger Tellier Craig (Godspeed You! Black Emperor, Et Sans), Joëlle Léandre, Jac Berrocal, John Berndt, Phill Niblock, Alexander MacSween, Michel Smith (Orchestre Vélo Karel), Helena Espvall, Jackie Blake, Dan Breen, Neil Wiernik (a.k.a. NAW) and Réjean Beaucage. He produced the score for the immersive film installation "Rouge Mékong" by François-Lavoie Pilote, presented in Montreal at la Société des arts technologiques in 2013 and 2014.

As an executive producer for the CBC radio, CKUT-FM and wikiradio.uqam.ca, Létourneau also produced concert recordings of musicians and performance artists such as Kathy Kennedy, Anna Friz, Richard H. Kirk, Jean Dupuy, Thomas Buckner, Johanne Hétu, Brandon Labelle, Christof Migone, Guillermo Gómez-Peña, Fred Frith, Chris Cutler, Serge Pey, Sam Shalabi, Alexandre Saint-Onge, Roger Tellier-Craig and Joachim Montessuis.

== Art (manoeuvers, site-specific actions, contextual art and transmedia works) ==
André Éric Létourneau's art manoeuvers work involves many media that are used simultaneously along with practices from other fields (such as science, sociology, psychology, community works, etc.). It may be difficult to categorize his work as much as of the practice by this artist involves operating directly within the social fabric while involving different social and ontological phenomena. Létourneau works primarily with the creation of situations based on cultural and physical environmental processes. His actions are often structured so as to avoid the creation of objects or material products. These traces in reality are primarily works where the confusion between art and life emerges as the salient feature. While operating within different institutions, the works of Létourneau often raise the concepts of power and consensus within the community.

Létourneau adapts his materials and methods of production according to the environmental requirements of each project. For example, the use of correspondences, legal agreements, CD publishing and radio broadcasts in his 2005 piece "Standard III". Létourneau also used other media such as integration of sign language and lip readings in various popular productions for television and Hollywood Cinema in "Biblical Consequences of the Representations" (2007–2010); photography, psychogeographic factors and individual conversations in "Standard II" (2001–present); radioactive material process in a particle accelerator at the Université Laval, aircraft and video in 1997's "3 9 30,"; anagrams and floating custom built sound modules in "Sonata for the Wolf" from 2001. "Létourneau is calling upon the structures that have and do produce us, our notions of nationality and belonging, and he is using the self-same tools that gave rise to our present-day status". Some Létourneau works are also raising issues about sex and human trafficking. These works were presented in collaboration with different NGOs, community groups, and human rights associations in Canada.

Since October 2001, Létourneau's artistic work has been centered around a series of meeting-maneuvers with citizens around the world. These maneuvers take place in the United States, Canada, China, Indonesia, the Philippines, Japan, Italy, Germany and France.

== Collaborations ==
Létourneau collaborated frequently with worked with many performance artists to create performances, video and installations, among them Jean Dupuy (a French artist associated with the Fluxus group), John Berndt, Christof Migone, Jocelyn Robert, Benoît Fauteux, Arahmaiani, the Chinese performance artist Zhu Yu and the Estonian group Non Grata.

=== Mineminemine ===
Mineminemine is an eclectic experimental music and performance art group he started along with Magali Babin and Alexandre Saint-Onge. They formed the band in 1999. The band plays a mix of different conceptual-based musical forms. An American tour of the band have been organised by the Baltimore-based interdisciplinary artist John Berndt in 2000, involving Christof Migone as a guest for the concert in New York City . Mineminemine performed at many art galleries and festivals in Europe and America such as the Red Room (Baltimore, USA), Hull Time Based Arts (Hull, UK), Westwerk (Hamburg, Germany), Université du Québec à Montréal, Leonard & Bina Ellen Art Gallery and Sala Rosa (Montréal, Canada).

== Research and academic activities ==
Between 1997 and 2001, Létourneau was a collaborator, executive producer and radio announcer for the CBC (Canadian Broadcasting Corporation). He has also served as a professor of Theory of Multimedia, Communication Phenomena Analysis, Art History and Conception of Transmedia Events at various colleges and universities. In 2001, along with the Chinese artists and curators Shu Yang and Chen Jin, he took part of the Open Arts Festival, the first series of Performance Art Festivals officially organised in the Republic of China.

Since the end of the 1980s, Létourneau has also been involved in cultural and political journalism in the written press and for various public and community media. He continues to produce radio documentaries about artists, including Zhu Yu, The Residents, Genesis P-Orridge, Willem de Ridder, Jose Luis Castillejo, Juan Hidalgo, Robert Ashley, Christian Vanderborgh, Stelarc, Cosey Fanni Tutti, Angéline Neveu, Charlemagne Palestine, Emmanuel Madan, Michel Chevalier, Esther Ferrer, Denys Tremblay, Julien Blaine, Jac Berrocal, Richie Hawtin, I Nyoman Rembang, and I Wayan Suweca.

Letourneau published articles in many art magazines such as Inter, Parallélogramme, Esse, and The Thing, and essays in many performance-art festival catalogs (such as Rencontres Internationales d'art performance de Québec, Diverse Universe IV / Non Grata and on the CBC website).

Since 2012, he is professor at Université du Québec à Montréal and researcher at Hexagram, Art & Flux (CNRS - La Sorbonne Panthéon) and at the research centre "Le corps de l'artiste" at the Institut supérieur des beaux-arts de Besançon/Franche-Comté.

== Awards and biennales ==
In 1997, André Éric Létourneau received the Media Art Award from the Pépinières Européennes. A book about his work P/ACT, was published by the Academy of Fine Arts in Enschede, the Netherlands. Since 1999, he received several grants from the Canada Council for the Arts and the Conseil des Arts et des Lettres du Québec and from several private foundations. At the opening of the XVe Biennale de Paris in 2008, it appointed director Mr Alexandre Gurita, declared about Letourneau's work: "La démarche d'André Eric Letourneau s'inscrit dans le spectre de l'invisibilité opérante, qui constitue l'axe de l'économie de l'immatériel et de la connaisance vers lesquelles nos sociétés évoluent. Dans sa pratique, le temps de l'art se fait avoir par le temps réel." (The work of André Éric Létourneau is created within the spectrum/ghost of the principle of operative invisibility, which is the axis of the dematerialized world we are now living in - because of its ways of storing knowledge and memory. In his art, the time of art is snatched by the time of reality.") In 2010, Létourneau's work is presented at the biennale "Madrid abierto" in Spain.

== Residencies ==
- 2014 - Chaire de recherche du Canada en dramaturgie sonore au théâtre, Saguenay, Canada
- 2008 - La Générale, Sèvres, Ile-de-France
- 2007 - Agence TOPO, Montréal, Québec, Canada
- 2006 - Le Lobe, Chicoutimi, Québec Canada, Canada
- 2002 - Les ateliers convertibles, Joliette, Québec, Canada
- 1997 - AKI, ArtEZ academie voor beeldende kunsten Enschede, The Netherlands

== Writings ==
- 2013 Musée standard Culture légitime? in. Schultze, B., Pelletier, S., Lefebvre, M., .(La société de conservation du présent) (1985–1994), Agence TOPO, Montréal. p. 216-236
- 2012 Caméra géotransgressives à Occupy Wall Street, Inter, no.111, Éditions intervention, Québec, p. 78-19
- 2012 Philippe Côté : Translection et économie de la culture, Inter, Éditions intervention, Québec, no.111, P. 96–97
- 2010 Pirate Radio & Manoeuvre: Radical Artistic Practices in Quebec in Langlois A., A É. Sakolsky R. & Van der Zon, M (ed.), Islands of Resistance : Pirate Radio in Canada, New Star Books, Vancouver, p. 145-159
- 2009 Le patrimoine culturel immatériel amérindien dans les rituels de guérisons en milieu carcéral, Criminologie, Vol. 42, n° 2, 2009, Presses de l'Université de Montréal, p. 153-172.
- 2008 Tanya Mars, Supplément, Vol. 1, n° 1, Artexte, Montréal, p. 101-105
- 2007 - Non Grata : The Pleasure of Intimacy, (introduction for the Non Grata Anthology) in Non Grata II, Non Grata Academy, Tallinn (in English and Estonian, republished in "Diverse Universe" 2009 and in "Non Grata III", 2010)
- 2007 - Non Grata in The Sirp, Tallinn, Estonia (in Estonian)
- 2002 - Mon truc à poil de Josée Fafard, Exhibition documentation, B312 Gallery, Montreal (in French)
- 2001 - Une beauté suspecte quant à sa nature légale?, in ESSE#43, Montréal, (in French)
- 2000 - L'accident comme thésaurisation, in Inter Magazine, "L'accident". Ed. Interventions (in French)
- 2000 - Réflexions shématiques, essay, in ESSE, "Dossier performance"
- 1999 - Robert Ashley, oralité - auralité, entrevue et essai, web site of the Canadian Broadcasting Corporation, www.radio-Canada.ca/radio/navire (in French)
- 1995 - La voix désincarnée et la «cybercarnation» ( ... ), in Inter Magazine #64 "Art et électronique". Ed. Interventions, Quebec
- 1995 - Première rencontre d'art performance de Québec, (catalog of the biennale event), Ed. Interventions, Québec
- 1995 - Joseph Ng ou les fins de la censure à postériori / The Necessary Stage : pour une restructuration d'une éthique de la parole, (essay on contemporary performance art in Singapour), In. Inter Magazine #62, Ed. Interventions
- 1994 - «Kreasi baru » outil séculaire des idéologies. (essay on javanese and balinese contemporary performance art), In. Inter magazine #59. Ed. Interventions, Québec, No. 59
- 1993 - Actions radiophoniques, In. Inter Magazine, No.55\56, Edition Interventions, Québec.
- 1991 - L'empire des ondes (médias et nouvelle radiophonie), A World of Waves (translated by Jean-Luc Svoboda) in Parallélogramme, Vol.16, No. 4, ANNPAC, Toronto, Ontario, Canada

== Discography ==
- 2014 Standard III, PPT \ Strembogen, Paris, 2CD, 2009
- 2008 Gingles et génériques (compilation with Les frères senseurs), CD, PPT \ Strembogen, Paris, 2008
- 2006 Montréal, capitale mondiale de la slush Vol I, II et III, Slush Kapital, online project Post Audio NetLab, Produced by Agence Topo, Montréal, Canada
- 1997 Compost, CD, Ohm/Avatar, Québec, Canada (w. Pierre-André Arcand, Jocelyn Robert et Christof Migone)
- 1996 Rappel/L'art téléphonique (compilation), CD, Ohm/Avtar no 006, Québec, Canada, 1996
- 1996 Radius 4 (compilation), What next?Recordings, CD, USA 1996
- 1996 1,000,033e anniversaire de l'art sur CD, par Inter/Le Lieu, Québec, Canada, 1996 (split with Alain Gilbertie, Robert Filliou, Richard Martel, etc.)
- 1995 "Oui, il parle de façon très rationnelle, mais ça n'a rien à voir avec la vraie vie", cassette BIOSKOP (split with NAW), Galerie Articule, Art Métropole, Toronto
- 1995 Ding dong Deluxe (compilation), CD, Ohm/Avtar, Québec, Canada, 1994
