= Saracino =

Saracino is an Italian surname. Notable people with the surname include:

- Antonio Pio Saracino (born 1976), Italian architect and designer
- Bernardo Saracino, American actor
- Janine Tagliante-Saracino, Ivorian diplomat
