= Extreme performance art =

Since the beginning of Dadaism in the Cabaret Voltaire, Zürich in 1916, many artists have experimented with extreme performance art as a critique of contemporary consumer culture. Some have used bodily fluids such as blood, faeces and urine. Other times they perform self-mutilation. Simulated (artificial) blood has also been used. In the 1960s and 1970s extreme performance was elevated to a movement with the Viennese actionists. In recent times there has been a resurgence in extreme performance as a response to the increasing alienation some artists feel in the face of today's technological advances.

== Artists ==
Some contemporary artists using extreme performance include:

- Ron Athey
- Abel Azcona
- Franko B
- Bob Flanagan
- Yang Zhichao
- Rocío Boliver
- Tehching Hsieh
- monochrom, e.g. Eignblunzn, Buried Alive (performance)
