= Huang Yan =

Huang Yan may refer to:

- Huang Yan (artist) (born 1966), Chinese painter, sculptor, photographer and performance artist
- Huang Yan (politician) (1912–1989), politician of PR China, former governor of Anhui Province
