= I Nyoman Rembang =

I Nyoman Renbang (1937–2001) was an Indonesian musician, composer, teacher and instrument maker. He is considered by many ethnomusicologists as one of the most influential Balinese musicians and composers of the twentieth century (along with I Nyoman Kaler, I Wayan Lotring, Gusti Putu Madia Geria, I Wayan Suweca and I Wayan Berata).

== Early life ==
I Nyoman Rembang started his musical career when he joined the local Gambuh group in his village. At seven he was already playing gender wayang on a professional basis. At eight he began to learn to play legong from many teachers around Badung, Bali. While still a teenager, Rembang was one of the most accomplished musicians in Bali. The Government of Bale offered him a job to teach Balinese Gamelan at the Surakarta Conservatory in Central Java. He also became a specialist of Javanese gamelan under RM Yudoprawiro, a nobleman from Surakarta Palace.

== Teaching ==
In 1960, with the former Bali's second governor, Ida Bagus Mantra, Rembang pioneered the establishment of the Balinese Conservatory. In 1963, Rembang resigned from his position in Surakarta to concentrated in Bali where he taught at the College of Music (SMKI). He was also frequently invited to teach in Europe as a visiting artist, composer and performer. He was the teacher of many contemporary composers and musicians such as I Wayan Suweca and André Éric Létourneau.

== Compositions ==
After finishing as a teacher at Denpasar's School of Arts in the mid-1980s, he created The Bungbang gamelan, a traditional instrument made from lengths of bamboo which can produce a certain tone based on it length. To play this gamelan at least 32 musicians are required and harmonises with suling (bambo's flutes). I Nyoman Rembang created many new compositions for this ensemble. Many of them have been presented during the annual Bali Arts Festival and on several occasions in Europe, America and Asia.

== References and sources ==
- Gamelan: Indonesian Arts in America" Special issue of Ear Magazine, volume 8 number 4, September/October/November 1983
- Tenzer, Michael, Balinese Music, Tuttle Publishing; Subsequent edition (August 1998), ISBN 962-593-169-4, ISBN 978-962-593-169-2
