= Gene Sherman (art specialist) =

Gene Sherman AM (born 1947) is a philanthropist, academic and expert on art, fashion and architecture. In 2018, she founded the Sherman Centre for Culture and Ideas.

== Early life and education ==
Sherman was born in 1947 and raised in South Africa to parents of European Jewish background. In the aftermath of the Sharpeville massacre in 1960, her parents decided to emigrate to Australia. They arrived in Melbourne in 1964, but returned to South Africa nine months later due to the large distances and political disagreement with the White Australia policy.

Upon return to South Africa, Sherman attended the University of the Witwatersrand in Johannesburg, graduating with a Bachelor of Arts (French) (Hons) and a Master of Arts (Hons). During this time she met and later wed Brian Sherman (co-founder of fund management group, EquitiLink, and Chair of Finances for the 2000 Sydney Olympic Committee). The couple have two children.

In 1976 Sherman once again emigrated to Australia, this time with her young family. After completing the preliminary research at the Sorbonne in Paris, Sherman completed a doctorate in early 20th-century French literature in 1981 at the University of Sydney.

== Career ==
Sherman taught at the University of Sydney from 1976 to 1980 and was appointed Head of Modern Languages at Ascham School in Sydney from 1981 to 1986.

=== Sherman Galleries ===
Following her teaching career, Sherman established the commercial Sherman Galleries (1986–2007) which exhibited the work of Australian artists including (alphabetically): Paddy Bedford, Gordon Bennett, Shane Cotton, Shaun Gladwell, Janet Laurence, Mike Parr, Imants Tillers and Hossein Valamanesh.

From 1989, Sherman focussed on working closely with artists from Asia, which included Ah Xian, Wenda Gu, Cai Guo-Qiang, Shen Shaomin, and Xu Bing, among others.

=== Sherman Contemporary Art Foundation (SCAF) ===
In 2008, Sherman founded the Sherman Contemporary Art Foundation (SCAF) which she directed as a planned decade-long exhibiting and commissioning program until 2017. Among others, SCAF commissioned new works by (alphabetically): Brook Andrew (Australia, 2010), Chien-Chi Chang (Taiwan, 2014), Olafur Eliasson (Denmark, 2013), Yang Fudong (China, 2011), Shaun Gladwell (Australia, 2015), Jitish Kallat (India, 2008), Janet Laurence (Australia, 2012), Dinh Q. Lê (Vietnam, 2011), Sopheap Pich (Cambodia, 2013), SANAA (Japan, 2009), Chiharu Shiota (Japan, 2013), Mikhael Subotzky (South Africa, 2016), Fiona Tan (Indonesia, 2010), Christian Thompson (Australia, 2015), Ai Weiwei (China, 2008) and Tokujin Yoshioka (Japan, 2011), Yang Zhichao (China, 2015).

In its final year of operation, SCAF curated major exhibitions, presenting the work of Shigeru Ban (Japan), and two exhibitions in Israel of Australian artists: Shaun Gladwell (1000 Horses, Tel Aviv Museum of Art) and a group show, Tracks and Traces, Negev Museum of Art, Be’er Sheva.

In 2013, Sherman launched Fugitive Structures, a series of architectural pavilions commissioned from architects in the Asia Pacific, Australia and the Middle East which ran until 2016. Fugitive Structures presented four pavilions featuring (chronologically): Crescent House by Andrew Burns (2013), Trifolium by Robert Beson and Gabriele Ulacco (AR-MA) (2014), Sway by Sack and Reicher + Muller with Eyal Zur (SRMZ) (2015) and Green Ladder by Vo Trong Nghia.

=== Sherman Centre for Culture and Ideas (SCCI) ===
In 2018, Sherman created the Sherman Centre for Culture and Ideas (SCCI) in Sydney as an extension of SCAF, focusing on elevating the disciplines of fashion and architecture.

As a "hub-based initiative", SCCI features two concentrated public programs annually. In 2018 SCCI's keynote series included presentations from speakers such as Kengo Kuma, Jil Magid, Ryue Nishizawa, Michael Rakowitz, Karen Walker. In 2019 SCCI's keynote guests and speakers included Behrouz Boochani, Julian Burnside, Angelica Cheung, Megan Cope, Odile Decq, Sou Fujimoto, Abbie Galvin, Junya Ishigami, Akira Isogawa, Anthony Lister, Kim McKay, Justice Melissa Perry, Antonio Pio Saracino, Alex Seton, Mark Tedeschi, Michael Zavros.

== Appointments and awards ==
- Adjunct Professor, UNSW Art & Design;
- Co-chair of the Acquisitions Committee of the TATE Asia Pacific (2009 to 2019) and Member of the TATE International Council (2019);
- Inaugural Patron of the Centre for Fashion at the Museum of Applied Arts and Sciences (formerly: Powerhouse Museum), Sydney (2015 to 2018);
- Trustee, Museum of Applied Arts and Sciences (1995 to 2001);
- Board Member, Bundanon Trust (1995 to 2002);
- Deputy Chair, Power Institute Council at the University of Sydney (1996 to 2006);
- Art + Australia (later: ArtAND) Editorial Advisory Board (2003 to 2015);
- Member, National Portrait Gallery Advisory Board, Canberra (2009 to 2011) and Deputy Chair, National Portrait Gallery Board of Trustees, Canberra (2011 to 2015);
- Member, Commissioner's Council, Australian Pavilion at the Venice Biennale (2007 to 2009);
- Board Member, National Gallery of Australia Foundation, Canberra (2000 to 2009);
- Chair, Voiceless Council (2009 to 2015);
- Board Member, Australia Israel Cultural Exchange (AICE) (2005 to 2010);
- Patron, NSW Friends of Bezalel Academy of Arts & Design, Jerusalem (2005 to 2010);
- Member, International Council of the Asia Society, New York (2001 to 2003);
- Member, Advisory Board of the Asia Society, Australasia Centre (2002 to 2003);
- Member, Cultural Advisory Committee to the City of Sydney (1997 to 1999);
- Board Member, Australian Centre for Photography (1994 to 1997);
- Board Member, Visual Arts Export Group (1996);
- Board Member, Alliance Française de Sydney (1991 to 1994).

Sherman is the recipient of the following awards:

- Honorary doctorate of design from the University of Technology, Sydney and University of Sydney (2017);
- B'nai B'rith award (2014);
- Member of the Order of Australia (2010);
- Officer of the ’Ordre des Arts et des Lettres (2016); and previously the Chevalier level in 2003;
- Honorary doctorate from University of Sydney (2008) and of design from University of Technology, Sydney (2017).
