= Zoran Poposki =

Artist, Curator and Cultural studies scholar

Zoran Poposki FRSA
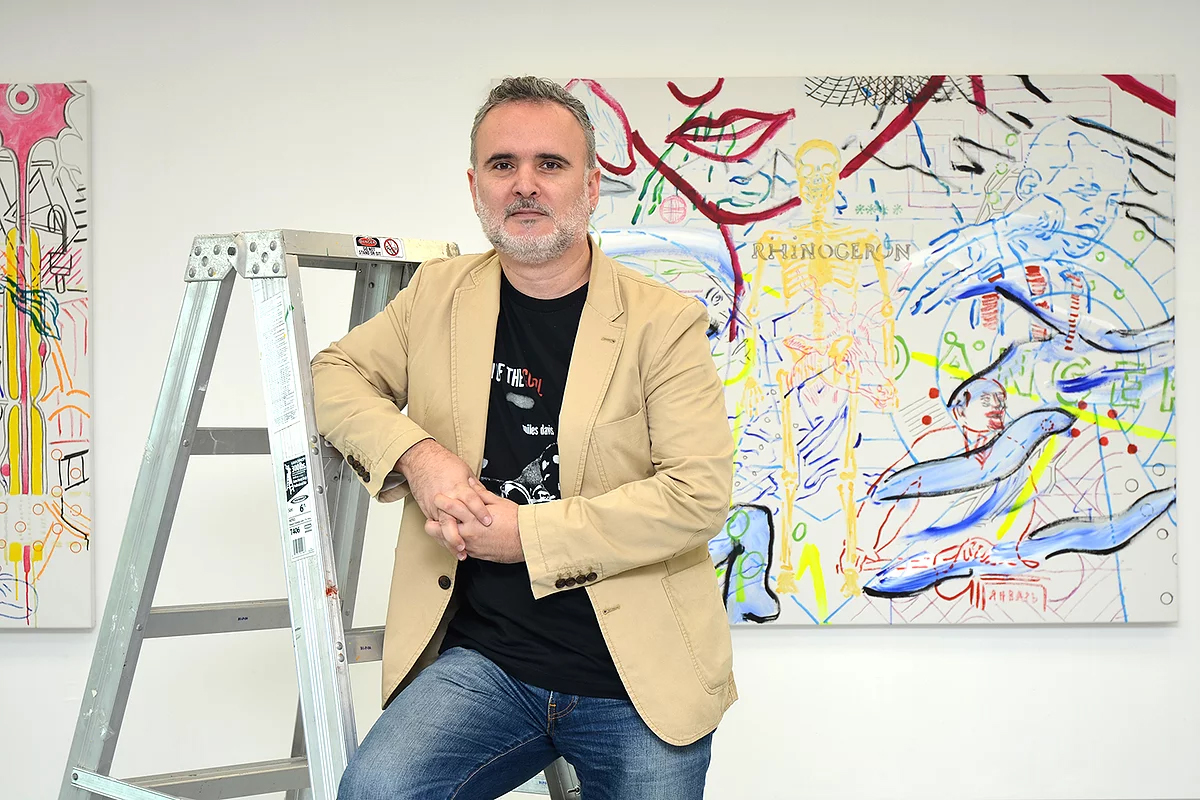
- Poposki in the studio (Hong Kong, 2018)
- Education: New York University, University of Deusto, Guggenheim Bilbao
- Website: www.poposki.art

Zoran Poposki is an artist, curator, and cultural studies scholar, based in Hong Kong.

== Education ==
Zoran Poposki holds a MFA from Danube University Krems in Austria and Transart Institute in New York, PhD in Cultural Studies from University EuroBalkan in Skopje, and Executive Certificate in International Leadership in Visual Arts Management from New York University, University of Deusto, and Guggenheim Bilbao.

== Work ==
Poposki works across a wide range of media, from digital art (including NFT art) to drawing, painting, printmaking, photography, video, performance, publishing, to social practice, and curating. His work explores themes related to translation, migration, identity, and public space.

Poposki's artworks have been exhibited in more than 100 solo and group exhibitions in galleries, museums, and art festivals worldwide, including: Institute of Contemporary Arts (ICA) in London, Centre for Chinese Contemporary Art in Manchester, XIII Cairo Biennale, 30th Biennial of Graphic Arts (Ljubljana), City Art Museum Ljubljana, the Danish National School of Performing Arts in Copenhagen, the Sergey Kuryokhin Center for Modern Art in St. Petersburg, Xi'an Art Museum in China, National Museum of Montenegro, National Gallery of Macedonia, Contemporary Art Museum of Macedonia, Museo de Arte de Ponce in Puerto Rico, Art Basel Hong Kong, etc. Collections featuring Poposki's work include the Videotage Media Art Collection (VMAC) in Hong Kong, and the Luciano Benetton Foundation's Imago Mundi collection in Italy.

Poposki's curatorial projects have been presented at the Hong Kong Arts Centre, Osage Gallery in Hong Kong, Centre for Chinese Contemporary Art in Manchester, ArtStays International Festival of Contemporary Art in Slovenia, Anita Chan Lai-ling Gallery in Hong Kong, Hong Kong Science Park, etc.

As an academic, Poposki's research is at the intersection of practice-based research, visual semiotics, civic art, and arts ecology. He is Associate Professor and Associate Head of Department (Visual Arts) at The Education University of Hong Kong.

== Awards ==
International art awards received by Poposki include CEC ArtsLink Award (New York), ArtSlant Prize Showcase Juried Winner (Los Angeles), Global Art Awards Finalist/Painting (Dubai, in association with The Wall Street Journal), Fellow of the Royal Society of Arts (The RSA, London), etc.
