= Yang Zhichao =

Chinese performance artist (born 1963)

- Born: 1963 (age 62–63); Gansu Province, China
- Education: Northwest Normal University
- Notable work: Planting Grass (2000); Iron (2000); Hide (2004); Love Story (2016)
- Style: Extreme performance art

Yang Zhichao (simplified Chinese: 杨志超; traditional Chinese: 楊志超; pinyin: Yáng Zhìchāo; born 1963) is a Chinese multi-disciplinary performance artist.

== Biography ==
Yang was born in 1963 in Yumen, Gansu Province, China. He graduated from the Art Department of Northwest Normal University in 1987. He relocated to Beijing in 1998 where his work began to address themes of globalization and its impact on the human body.

Yang’s work focuses on how the human body is perceived and used in different environments, contrasting its role as a labor tool in rural Gansu with its function within the industrialized context of urban Beijing. Through his performance art, Yang uses his own body to address social issues, illustrating his view that in the modern era the body is often treated as subject to societal and state control rather than as solely personal property. Some of his performances have involved provocative acts, including staged surgical procedures performed without anesthesia. His later works continue to explore these thematic concerns, further examining the human condition through physical performance.

Yang's work is exhibited in China and around the world, including the exhibit titled Fuck Off at Eastlink Gallery in Shanghai (2000), the Guangdong Museum of Art in Guangzhou (2003), the Dadao Live Art Festival in Beijing (2004), and a China Live tour of eight major institutions in the UK organized by Beijing-based curator Shu Yang (2005).

== Notable works ==
- Planting Grass (2000) involved nurses inserting grass into the artist's skin without anesthesia during the Fuck Off exhibit at the Eastlink Gallery warehouse in Shanghai.
- Iron (2000) in Beijing, China, involved the artist being branded with his own identification number.
- Hide (2004) in Beijing, China, explored the human body's compatibility with nature and technology, drawing inspiration from manufactured prosthetics. Artist Ai Weiwei surgically implanted an unspecified metal object into Yang Zhichao's thigh without anesthesia, and its exact nature remains unknown to him.
- China Red (2005–2006) saw Yang paint on silk using drops of blood mixed with ink and mineral pigments to reflect his experience of daily life in the countries, where he performed the work (the UK & Germany).
- Chinese Bible (2009) was a collection of notebooks and diaries collected by the artist, mostly from Panjiayuan Market in Beijing. Dating from 1949 to 1999, the books contained the personal writings of generations of Chinese, which the artist used to represent the personal experiences of everyday people during a century of political upheaval.
- Love Story (2016) offers insight into intimacy by documenting Yang's relationship with his wife, Zhang Lan. Since 1996, the artist has kept a record of every time he has sex with his wife, initially using a collection of punch cards to record the time, day, and length of coitus. The work, which began as a private project, grew into an illustrated diary, including information and details of other personal events. It was released to the public on its 20th anniversary in 2016.

== Solo exhibitions ==
Sources:

- 2015: Chinese Bible, Sherman Contemporary Art Foundation, Sydney, Australia
- 2012: Art Patent Office – Yang Zhichao archives, Li-Space, Beijing, China
- 2011: Chinese Bible, 10 Chancery Lane Gallery, Hong Kong, China
- 2009: Chinese Bible, China Art Archives & Warehouse, Beijing, China
- 2008: Yang Zhichao Works Exhibitions 1999–2008, Eastlink Gallery, Shanghai, China

== Selected group shows ==
- 2016: Beyond Action, Kylin Contemporary Center of Art, Beijing, China
- 2013: Parallel Lives: China/Hong Kong (with Douglas Young), 10 Chancery Lane Gallery, Hong Kong, China
- 2012: Living·Being, Songzhuang Art Center, Beijing, China
- 2008: Inward Gazes-Documentaries of Chinese Performance Arts, Macau Museum of Art, Macau, China
- 2006: Performance Red!, Haus der Kulturen der Welt, Germany
- 2005–2006: City Skin: Images of the Contemporary Metropolis, Tap Seac Gallery, Macau (3 December 2005 – 15 January 2006) & Shenzhen Art Museum, Guangdong, China (5 March – 5 April 2006)
- 2005–2006: Conspire, TS1 Gallery, Beijing, China
- 2005: China Live, UK touring show, 13–28 October 2005, which visited Centre for Chinese Contemporary Art, Manchester; Greenroom, Manchester; Chapter Arts Centre, Cardiff; Warwick Arts Centre, Coventry; Baltic Centre for Contemporary Art, Gateshead; Bluecoat Gallery, Liverpool; Colchester Arts Centre, Colchester; Arnolfini, Bristol; and the Victoria and Albert Museum, London
- 2004: Dadao Live Art Festival, Jianwai SOHO, Beijing, China
- 2003: Live Art Festival, Beijing, China
- 2003: Distance, Guangdong Museum of Contemporary Art, Guangzhou, China
- 2000: Fuck Off, Eastlink Gallery, Shanghai, China

== See also ==
- Shock art
- Transgressive art
- Performance art in China
- Ai Weiwei
- Shu Yang
- Fuck Off (art exhibition)
