= Magali Babin =

Canadian musician, composer and sound artist (born 1967)

Magali Babin (born 1967) is a Canadian musician, composer and sound artist based primarily in Montreal, Quebec. Active since the mid-1980s, she has received several commissions from many new music festivals and organisations.

== Artistic career ==
Magali Babin is an interdisciplinary artist with a practice in sound art. Exploring space as sound material, Babin draws her materials from haptic proximities, acoustic landscapes, and real-life contexts to create environments composed of sequences, textures, and perspectives. Her works explore imperceptible aspects that create alertness and attention through listening. In recent projects, Babin has examined perception and memory by investigating the ways we identify sounds. Babin has performed in international festivals in Canada, USA, and Europe. Her installations have been presented at the Musée d'art contemporain de Montréal (MAC), as part of the 2011 Quebec Triennial (MTL), at Mois Multi 2012 (QC), and at La Fabrique in 2013 (Nantes, France). Babin has a doctorate in art studies from UQAM. Babin's sound work occurs through the massive amplification of tiny resonances in different objects. In her solo work, she usually produces dense and brooding soundscapes from a collection of recordings and live actions. Known for the use of her custom-made musical instruments and non-standard use of musical instruments, her works are based on indeterminacy in music, tape music and improvisation. Babin has received grants from the Inter-Arts Program of the Canada Council for the Arts and from the Conseil des arts et des lettres du Québec.

== Education ==
Babin has a doctorate in art studies from Université du Québec à Montréal (UQAM).

== Notable works ==
Chemin de Fer (2000) is a sound art piece, produced by the Canadian Broadcasting Corporation, under a program developed and curated by Mario Gauthier.

== Collaborations ==
From 1983 to 1988, Babin has been part of the Montreal-based experimental music girl group Nitroglycérine. Since the 1990s, she has collaborated frequently with many performance artists to create performances, video and installations, including John Berndt, Christof Migone, André Éric Létourneau, Erin Sexton, Martin Tétreault, Herman Kolgen and Istvan Kantor. She is also part of the music performance trio mineminemine along with André Éric Létourneau and Alexandre Saint-Onge.
