= Rachel Cooper (presenter) =

American performing arts presenter

Rachel Cooper (April 20, 1954) is an American performing arts presenter specializing in cultural exchange. She is the Director of Global Performing Arts and Cultural Initiatives for the Asia Society. Before joining the Asia Society she headed the Festival of Indonesia which brought over 200 artists to 30 states in the United States. Along with I Wayan Suweca and Michael Tenzer, she co-founded Gamelan Sekar Jaya which was the first community-based Balinese gamelan in the United States.

== Career ==
Cooper lived in Indonesia from 1983 to 1988, teaching English while participating in performances at Taman Ismail Marzuki. In 1985 she helped organize Gamelan Sekar Jaya's first tour to Indonesia. The group had been invited to perform at the Bali Arts Festival in Denpasar and would continue to perform in six other cities including Jogjakarta, in Central Java. After returning to the United States, Cooper coordinated the Performing Arts program of the Festival of Indonesia from 1990 to 91.

She has worked at the Asia Society since 1993 and has produced and presented over 300 performances, tours, and commissioned artists. She has worked with many of the premiere cultural institutions in the United States. Among the many projects she has produced are Creative Voices of Muslim Asia, Chorus Repertory Theater of Manipur, Dance the Spirit of Cambodia, Nan Jombang, Shahram and Hafez Nazeri in the Path of Rumi,

Cooper has presented and curated film programs from India, Indonesia, China, Iran, Japan, Korea, and Thailand, as well as producing and presenting performances from throughout Asia. She has co-sponsored and presented various film festivals and film series at the Asia Society, including the Iranian Documentary and Short Film Festival, the Asian American International Film Festival, and the IAAC India Film Festival, among others. She has organized major arts and culture initiatives, including the Festival of Song: Music of India and Pakistan. In addition, she has conducted and published research on the global impact of the arts, which resulted in the report Making a Difference through the Arts. In 2006 she was awarded the Dawson Award for Sustained Excellence in Arts Programming.
