= Suki Chan =

Artist

- Chan in 2026
- Born: Hong Kong
- Known for: Video art Installation Art; New Media Art
- Notable work: Conscious (2026), Fog In My Head (2022), Hallucinations (2020), Memory (2019), Lucida (2016), Still Point (2012), Sleep Walk Sleep Talk (2010), Interval II (2008)

Suki Chan (born in Hong Kong) is an artist and filmmaker based in London. Her work has been shown at film festivals, galleries and museums internationally. Chan's work explores human perception, memory, and subjective reality through film, photography and sound.

Chan's debut feature-length documentary, Conscious (2026), premiered at CPH:DOX and was subsequently selected for screenings at Fondazione Prada and the Global Science Film Festival. In 2026, she was longlisted for Best Debut Director (Feature Documentary) at the British Independent Film Awards. She is a member of Women in Film & TV.

== Education ==
- 1996: Foundation in Art and Design - Winchester School of Art
- 1999: BA Fine Art - Goldsmiths, University of London
- 2008: MA Fine Art - Chelsea College of Arts

== Film Work ==
Chan directed the feature documentary Conscious (2026), which explores consciousness, identity, memory and dementia. The film received support from Screen Scotland, the BFI Doc Society, and the Sundance Institute Documentary Fund, and premiered at CPH:DOX. In 2026, it was selected for screening at Fondazione Prada in Milan and the Global Science Film Festival in Basel. The film was longlisted for two British Independent Film Awards Best Debut Director (Feature Documentary) and The Raindance Maverick Award.

== Commissions ==
Chan has been commissioned by various organisations to produce work for both galleries and public spaces; including Science Gallery Dublin, Film and Video Umbrella, Centre for Chinese Contemporary Art, The Young Foundation, Art on the Underground and Aspex Gallery.

== Collections ==
Chan's work is included in the collections of the Museum of London, Government Art Collection, University of the Arts London, University of Salford Arts Collection, David Roberts Art Foundation, and The Ingram Collection.

== Honours ==
In 2008, she was nominated for the Northern Art Prize and in 2010, she was shortlisted for the Renaissance Art Prize.

In 2009, Chan was one of the six young British artists featured in the BBC's series School of Saatchi. On the show, Tracey Emin who said that her work was better than some established artists. "The film's flipping brilliant," she said. "There's a few artists' names come to mind when I saw it but this knocks spots off them." Chan's work also received a positive review in The Guardian newspaper from the art critic Robert Clark who wrote "Suki Chan's art makes us wonder in more ways than one. It enables us to treasure the wonder of the world through daring to suggest the dreadful cost of the loss of such wonderful phenomena."

In 2020, she received a FLAMIN Productions award from Film London, supported by Arts Council England.

== Residencies ==
In partnership with Bluecoat and Arts Council England, Chan was invited to be one of the artists in residence at the Belong care village, Crewe. Chan interviewed residents which formed the basis of her project, CONSCIOUS.

In 2005, Chan completed a residency at the Osteopathic Centre for Children, producing 1,000 origami cranes for their permanent installation at the charity's Manchester base.
