= He Chengyao =

Chinese artist

- 何成瑤
- Born: 1964 (age 61–62); Sichuan, China
- Education: Central Academy of Fine Arts
- Known for: Performance artist

He Chengyao (Chinese: 何成瑤; born 1964) is a Chinese artist residing in Beijing, China. Her artwork explores nudity, mental illness, memory, and mother-daughter relationships through performance, photography, and video. Her work has been widely exhibited in China, Italy, Japan, South Korea, the United Kingdom, and the United States. She is well known for her performance pieces, Opening the Great Wall (2001) and 99 Needles (2002).

== Biography ==
He was born in 1964 in the Sichuan province in China. He's parents worked in a pottery factory in Rongchang (present-day Chongqing) and, when He was conceived, the factory ordered He's parents to have an abortion because they were unmarried. However, they decided to keep her and as a result He's parents were both fired. He's mother was nineteen when she gave birth to him and the couple subsequently had two more children.

During He's childhood, the Cultural Revolution gained momentum and He's father was imprisoned for his political views. This left He's mother to raise the children on her own. Having faced years of humiliation from giving birth out of wedlock, He's mother was left with no job and a jailed husband and began suffering from considerable mental distress. He's mother started to strip in public, causing her children discomfort and shame. He speculates that her mother was predisposed to mental illness, as her grandfather also suffered from similar mental distress.

He taught mathematics at an elementary school for three years before attending the Sichuan Fine Arts Institute, where she trained as an oil painter. There, she met a painter whom she eventually married. She graduated from the Sichuan Fine Arts Institute in 1989. She then worked briefly as an art teacher, before becoming a full-time oil painter. She gave birth to a son in her twenties.

Feeling increasingly dissatisfied with her life in Chongqing, He moved to Beijing in 2000. She entered an introductory contemporary art (dangdai yishu) course at the Central Academy of Fine Arts in Beijing, and graduated in 2001. There, she was inspired by the art theories she was introduced to, and created her first piece of contemporary artwork, Hair (2001).

In 2006, He began making documentary films about families who suffer from mental illness in her hometown. She wanted to present an honest depiction of the lives of families who are marginalized and neglected by society. Families Affected by Mental Illness premiered in 2007 at the Zendai Museum of Modern Art in Shanghai. He expressed in an interview, "I hope people can pay attention to the children from poor families and those who suffer from mental illness. I myself came from that kind of family." After the local government watched his interviews, the families were given a stipend.

From April 2012 to May 2013, He lived in a Tibetan Buddhist monastery. In Tibet, she volunteered as a teacher, and was heavily influenced by Buddhist teachings. Afterwards, she described her artistic process as "a kind of self-cultivation".

== Art work ==
He's work consciously highlights the role mental illness has played in her life and her family's history. Although her performances are frequently considered transgressive and are frowned upon by many including He's friends and teachers, this only reaffirms He's belief in the necessity of her work as both an intensely powerful form of self-expression and a challenge against social stigmas surrounding mental illness. Critics have also stressed how He's performance work engages with feminism, body politics, and nationalist and transnational issues.

=== Opening the Great Wall (2001) ===
Although He initially specialized in oil paintings, she is now predominantly focused on performance art. He states that her artistic shift was abrupt and occurred during a visit to the Great Wall of China: she spontaneously enacted a performance by taking off her red top and walking partially nude among German artist H.A. Schult's installations of myriad terracotta sculptures. Her action received much media attention, and stole Schult's thunder. She later titled this performance piece Opening the Great Wall. He has referred to her mother's mental illness as well as Chinese social issues as inspirations for this work.

Opening the Great Wall stirred up huge controversy among both domestic and international art critics. While some deemed it "immoral" and "profiteering", others commended her intelligence and wit. Opening the Great Wall was the first of many works in which He explores Chinese social and political issues by using her own body as an artistic medium.

=== Mama and Me (2001) ===
In the summer of 2001, He returned to her hometown of Chongqing to visit her mother. Upon arriving, He witnessed her mother sitting quietly on a stool, half-naked, and playing with a rotten apple. She proceeded to take her top off and stand behind her mother to produce seven photographs for Mama and Me. This was the first time He and her mother had been photographed together. He revealed in an interview that the series “allowed me to squarely face my family’s history of insanity that I had carefully hidden and avoided for so long, to reaffirm the family line that connects me and my mother, and to partially satisfy a yearning of more than thirty years to support, touch, and embrace her.”

=== Illusion (2002) ===
Taking place in an open courtyard, He wore a hand-sewn, white robe that hung to her ankles for this performance as she walked barefoot along a long gray brick wall. He had a male member of the audience hold up a mirror to reflect sunlight onto the brick wall. She attempted to catch the light, and the performance that followed was documented in twelve photographs. He frantically chased after the light with erratic movements while a Buddhist meditation chant played in the background. He explained in an interview that "...the light came to represent life, as well as the things we desire, be it power, money, or romantic love. When you try to catch this beam of light, you realise that you cannot possess it, so what meaning does it have? How can we understand it while we are alive? How can we bring out those higher qualities that we have within? How can we be compassionate? How can we help others? How can we cultivate our love for others?".

=== 99 Needles (2002) ===
In 2002, He sought to fully embody the suffering her mother went through at the hands of pseudo-acupuncturists who had tried to cure her mental illness by forcefully doing acupuncture on her in the 1960s. With the help of a friend trained in Chinese medicine, He staged the performance piece 99 Needles, in which her body and face were pierced with 99 acupuncture needles. In the process she became light-headed, and fainted. He referred to this artwork as "a tribute to [her] mother, who suffered hardships and humiliation."

== Exhibitions ==
=== Solo exhibitions ===
- Rose: He Chengyao Performance Art Exhibition - Suzhou River Art Center, Shanghai (2011)
- Pain of the Soul: Performance Art and Video Works by He Chengyao - Shanghai Zendai Museum of Modern Art, Shanghai (2007)
- "The Extension of Limbs" - Juhua Gallery, Shanghai (2007)
- He Chengyao Performance Photo Exhibition - Soobin Art Gallery, Singapore (2004)
- "Performance Art He Chengyao" - One World Art Center, Beijing (2003)
- "He Chengyao Oil Painting" - Qinhao Gallery, Beijing (2000)

=== Group exhibitions ===
- Half the Sky: Chinese Women Artists - Red Gate Gallery, Beijing (2016)
- "WOMEN我們" - Chinese Culture Center, San Francisco (2012)
- "Negotiable Values" - Chinese Art Centre, Manchester (2010)
- "Chain" - Chinese Art Centre, Manchester (2007)
- "Global Feminisms" - Brooklyn Museum, New York (2007)
- "Out from XiNan" - Guangdong Museum, Guangzhou (2007)
- Performance Art Documentations from China - SUMU Titanik Gallery, Turku (2006)
- International Exhibitionist - Curzon Soho Cinema, London (2006)
- Cruel/Loving Bodies - Hong Kong Arts Centre, Hong Kong (2006)
- "Vital", International Chinese Live Art Festival - Chinese Art Centre, Manchester (2006)
- "Loft of Language" - ThreeQuarters Art Gallery, Beijing (2005)
- "China Live" UK touring exhibition, (2005)
- "The Magic Lantern" - Galway Arts Center, Ireland (2005)
- Changing Faces - Taipei Artist Village (2005)
- "Transborder Language" - Beijing Tokyo Art Projects, Beijing (2005)
- "The Wall" - Millennium Art Museum, Beijing / University of Buffalo Art Galleries, New York (2005)
- "Making Relationships" - Taipei Art Museum & Kaohsiung Museum of Fine Arts, Taiwan (2005)
- Asian Women's Art - Tokyo Joshibi University's Art Museum, Tokyo (2004)
- Spellbound Auro-The New Vision of Chinese Photography - Taipei Modern Art Museum, Taipei (2004)
- 14th Recontre Internationale Art Performance Quebec - Le Lieu Centre Art, Quebec City / Clark Gallery, Montreal (2004)
- 798 Photographic Memory Exhibition - 798 Art Zone, Beijing (2004)
- The Future of Imagination 2: International Performance Art Event, Singapore (2004)
- Listen to Men's Story From Women - 798 Art Zone, Beijing (2003)
- 5th International Performance Art Festival - Bangkok (2003)
- "The Limits of Bodies" - Shangrila Culture and Art Center, Beijing (2002)
- "Dream02" - OXO Gallery and Barge House, UK (2002)
- "Dialogue Puzzle" - Padua Youth Museum, Padua (2001)

== See also ==
- Chinese art
