= Fuck Off (art exhibition) =

Art exhibition which ran alongside the Third Shanghai Biennale (2000)

Coordinates: 31.2494°N 121.4441°E

Fuck Off (Chinese: 不合作方式; pinyin: Bù Hézuò Fāngshì) was a contemporary art exhibition which ran alongside the 3rd Shanghai Biennale (2000) in Shanghai, China. The exhibition's title translates as "Uncooperative attitude" in Chinese, but the blunter English language sentiment was deemed preferable. The exhibition encompassed conceptual, performance, and protest art.

== Overview ==
The exhibition was held in an Eastlink Gallery warehouse by Feng Boyi and the 43-year-old Ai Weiwei, and is revered by many young Chinese artists. Ai encapsulated Fuck Off's artistic-curatorial attitude with one set of photos in which he gives the finger in turn to the White House, the Forbidden City, and the viewer, and another in which he drops an ancient Han dynasty Chinese vase, which smashes at his feet. Coinciding with the Shanghai Biennale, the opening of the exhibition embodied an uncooperative attitude towards the establishment, as summed up in the closing line of the exhibition catalogue: "Perhaps there is nothing that exists 'on-site,' but what will last forever is the very uncooperativeness with any system of power discourse."

The exhibition included works by 48 avant-garde artists, many of whom exhibited provocative and controversial works. Among them was He Yunchang, who posed in a color photograph bare-chested while suspended from a crane by his ankles over a rushing river, into which he holds a knife—the same knife he later used to cut his own arm. Sun Yuan exhibited Solitary Animal, a glass case containing an animal skeleton and—purportedly—enough poison gas to wipe out the show's entire audience. Wang Chuyu's performance consisted of a four-day fast. Zhu Ming floated down the Huangpu River in a plastic bubble wearing a diaper. The most controversial work was probably Eating People by Zhu Yu, which was eventually not displayed in the show. It consisted of a series of photographs of him cooking and eating what is alleged to be a human fetus. One picture, circulated on the internet via e-mail in 2001, provoked investigations by both the FBI and Scotland Yard. The piece's cannibalistic theme was controversial in Britain when Zhu's work was featured on a Channel 4 documentary exploring Chinese modern art in 2003. In response to the public reaction, Zhu Yu stated, "No religion forbids cannibalism. Nor can I find any law which prevents us from eating people. I took advantage of the space between morality and the law and based my work on it". Zhu has claimed that he used an actual fetus that was stolen from a medical school.

The exhibition ran for ten days from 4 to 14 November, 2000. After the opening, the Cultural Inspection Bureau raided the exhibition and removed works considered inappropriate. Later on, they demanded the exhibition to close for being inappropriate, prior to its scheduled closing date. The police confiscated all remaining catalogs for not having the publication permit.

In an interview by Chin-Chin Yap, Ai Weiwei was asked if the actual exhibit of Fuck Off had a concept similar to the Black, White, and Gray Cover Books he published. He went on to say that after the books were finished, there were a lot of interesting art happening, and the people in his life continually recommended creating an exhibit with a theme similar to that of the books. His opinion was not that the show was really good because it was organized so quickly, and he knew that there was a possibility that it could be shut down by the police and having all of the works confiscated. Luckily, he said that the artists involved were "cooperative and interested and the attitude was there." In a very eye-opening statement, Ai goes on to say that, "maybe Fuck Off was most important because of what it represented." Those involved had clear ideas about the message they wanted to send to Chinese institutions and Western curators, institutions, and dealers: "We had to say something as individual artists to the outside world, and what we said was 'fuck off'."

Many influential artists in the contemporary Chinese art scene took part, many of whom have since been included in international exhibitions, catalogs, and television documentaries.

A catalog of the exhibition has been published, a black book with the simple title FUCK OFF on its cover.

== Feng Boyi on Fuck Off ==
Co-curator Feng Boyi felt as though Chinese artists were just working for foreigners because the early Chinese contemporary art shows were being held in foreign countries. In co-curating the exhibition, Feng said, "We wanted to show the 'fuck off' style, not working for the government or in the style of western countries, but a third way."

== Co-curators ==
Description by Ai Weiwei and Feng Boyi in October, 2000:

Fuck Off is an event that is participated by both the organizers and artists. In today's art, the alternative is playing the role of revising and criticizing the power discourse and mass convention. In an uncooperative and uncompromisable way, it self-consciously resists the threat of assimilation and vulgarization. A cultural attitude that stands against the power and makes no compromise with vulgarization is, together with independent individual experiences, feelings and creations, is what extends the pursuit and desire of art for spiritual freedom – an everlasting theme. Such a cultural attitude is obviously exclusive and alienated. It aims at dealing with such themes as cultural power, art institution, art trends, communications between the East and West, exoticism, post-modernism and post-colonialism, etc.

Fuck Off emphasizes the independent and critical stance that is basic to art existence, and its status of independence, freedom and plurality in the situation of contradictions and conflicts. It tries to provoke artist's responsibility and self-discipline, search for the way in which art lives as "wildlife", and raise questions about some issues of contemporary Chinese art.

Allegory, directing questioning, resistance, alienation, dissolution, endurance, boredom, bias, absurdity, cynicism and self-entertainment are aspects of culture as well as features of existence. Such issues are re-presented here by the artists with unprecedented frankness and intelligence, which leaves behind fresh and stimulating information and traces of existence.

In this exhibition, participants and their works are not objects of choice, identification and judgment. They have no quest for any kind of excuse. Group identification and inner difference are both so fully respected and encouraged that it may be doubted if there is the necessity for the presence of audience.

An on-site ambiguity and uncertainty forces one to seek meaning and satisfaction only in the form of proliferation and postpone. Perhaps there is nothing that exists 'on-site', but what will last forever is the very uncooperativeness with any system of power discourse."

== Notable works ==
Accidental Dropping

Ai Weiwei was concerned with Chinese history as a whole and the fact that people were not properly learning about it or preserving it. By dropping a near-priceless artifact, Ai was essentially asking if the Chinese people really care about their own history, taking something valuable and reducing it to shards.

Golden Sunlight (Performance)

He Yunchang is known to push the limits in his performance art. His goal is to "seek enduring and fearless confrontation with reality and a poetic expression for this."

Chinese Landscape: Tattoo No. 2

Huang Yan sees landscape paintings as a way of expressing himself. His landscape scenes are painted on his body, on pork, and even on cow bones.

Mouse

Jin Le experiments with a wide variety of materials in order to demonstrate what he thinks that people and animals would look like if scientists succeeded in combining them into one form.

Peace series No. 19

Liang Yue uses Photoshop as his main form of expression. He attempts to Photoshop a variety of ads onto photos he takes and then post them absolutely everywhere in an attempt to require people to see them.

Paradise Lost No. 17

Meng Huang was born in Beijing, and says, "I grew up, knowing nothing. Now I live in Beijing and find that works of art stars are very much westernized." His works seem to be reminiscent of an almost unattainable land that was once a paradise, but is now sad and downtrodden.

Stamping on Water

Song Dong notes, "I find more pleasure in doing 'art' as a matter because of the openness of artistic language. As I understand it, the time is over when artistic styles are defined by medium, method and paradigm. When I make use of these, the only thing that I have in mind is whether they fit my ideas." His work seems to show a lot of disparity in life and the fact that humans are a lot less important to the world around them.

Skin Graft

Zhu Yu is a very outspoken artist who uses his work to make a statement. His work is aimed at making people think about the world around them. He says that "We're not very afraid that we are not thinking what others are thinking since such an issue is taken care of by our spirit. What we are afraid of is that people are thinking what they are not supposed to think. So we need to re-think over what people initially take to be right, and abstract out everything that has nothing to do with reality."

== List of artists exhibited ==
Ai Wei Wei, Cao Fei, Chen Lingyang, Chen Shaoxiong, Chen Yunquan, Ding Yi, Feng Weidong, Gu Dexin, He An, He Yunchang, Huang Lei, Huang Yan, Jin Lei, Li Wen, Li Zhiwang, Liang Yue, Lin Yilin, Lu Chunsheng, Lu Qing, Meng Huang, Peng Yu, Peng Donghui, Qin Ga, Rong Rong, Song Dong, Sun Yuan, Wang Bing, Wang Yin, Wang Chuyu, Wang Xingwei, Wu Ershan, Xiao Yu, Xu Tan, Xu Zhen, Yang Yong, Yang Fudong, Yang Maoyuan, Yang Zhenzhong, Yang Zhichao, Zhang Dali, Zhang Shengquan, Zheng Guogu, Zhu Ming, and Zhu Yu. Chen Hao, Zheng Jishun, and Song Tao exhibited a video documenting their walk through the city while blood leaked from plastic tubes inserted into their veins.
