= Huang Yan (artist) =

- Born: 1966 (age 59–60)
- Occupations: painter and photographer

Huang Yan (born 1966 in Jilin province, China) is a multimedia artist, Taoist, and businessman based in Beijing. He graduated from the Changchun Normal Academy in 1987, and is currently a lecturer at Changchun University.

In 1999, Huang Yan began a series of paintings/photographs of traditional Chinese landscape paintings using the human body as a canvas, called Chinese Landscapes. Both Feng Boyi and Ai Weiwei noticed his artwork, including it in their controversial Fuck Off exhibition in 2000 in Shanghai. His art can relate to Chinese people and their culture, even though it is still considered contemporary art. The landscape paintings he uses come from the Song dynasty, which is what most consider the most "Chinese-looking". On the other hand, the human body was seldom used in ancient Chinese art, which is what makes this art very contemporary.

== Career ==
Huang started his career as a poet and was recognized as an artist who used creative mediums such as the human body, ox bones, busts of Mao Zedong, flowers, musical instruments and old communist uniforms. He gradually became more and more popular through his art.

In 2008, Huang Yan was nominated for the Art Gallery of Ontario's first Grange Prize. This prize meant that he was offered an art residency anywhere in Canada. He attended the Banff Centre for ten days, and took the opportunity to meet many different artists. He chose the Banff Centre to experience the winter and Canada's Aboriginal culture. He explored the area with his wife and even painted the background scenery on his face.

Besides being an artist and poet, Huang Yan has also published several books regarding the emergence of new, contemporary Chinese artists. He operates his own gallery, Must Be Contemporary Art, in Beijing's 798 Factory/Art Center.

== Artistic styles and media ==
Chinese Landscape Series No. 1, 6, 3, and 8 (1999) at the Hirshhorn Museum and Sculpture Garden in 2022

Since his art medium is the human body, some question whether or not the body is the art or the painting on the body. "As the body moves, the painted subject takes another shape or meaning." Huang Yan's creations can also be considered performance art, even though he himself has never performed. In Chinese culture, nudity and the human body are still considered taboo. Landscapes symbolize the intellectual values of the erudite class. Painting them on body parts not only makes it avant-garde, but it is a new way of using traditional Chinese art and of representing the relationship between man and nature, a very Taoist concept.

Although his art is considered taboo, his goal is not to be offensive; his art is very symbolic and a way to express his beliefs. Other contemporary artists such as Ai Weiwei are bitter towards the government and used the "Fuck Off Exhibition" to express their anger and beliefs about society and government. However, some of Huang Yan's most offensive art include photographs of naked women. One of his photographs includes a painted woman running across the Great Wall of China, a very provocative act in Chinese culture.

Each of his photographs have a black or white, brightly lit background. Up close, one may notice small details such as peasant workers, small homes, and more. The symbolism in his art is very important, the "deep cultural roots changing with the demands of modernity."

Zhang Zhaohui commented on Huang's art, saying that his art was developed upon Andy Warhol's art. He says that Huang's art does not tell a story, but instead is in a pursuit of values towards traditional Chinese cultures "within contemporary society itself, both Chinese and international."

Huang also has a series of works where he draws faces and eyes on sofas and couches. Another one of his mediums is porcelain. He created a series of porcelain portraits of Mao Zedong, but these were stopped by the authorities before they could leave the country to be a part of an exhibition in Paris, France. The Chinese authorities deemed them disrespectful to Mao Zedong.

By using controversial art mediums, Huang is challenging the limits of Chinese traditional landscape paintings. His wife Zhang Tiemei is an artist who has been trained classically and often will execute the painting as they work together. If the face, leg, or arm moves then the meaning of the landscape can have a new twist to it. Art is part of the Chinese culture, and by painting traditional art Huang is reminding society to never forget what Chinese art means to them as a part of their heritage. It is where Huang enjoys expressing both his Zen and his Buddhist ideas.

In his Chinese Landscape-Tattoo series and his Four Seasons series Huang incorporates man and nature. Other Chinese artists such as Cang Xin, Li Wei, Liu Ren, Ma Yanling and Wu Yuren, are also using the human body as an art medium to explore contemporary Chinese art: "Some photos are humorous, others disconcerting, but all are fascinating reflections of life in China today." Cang Xin, for example, uses his own tongue to taste places that represent Chinese culture in a series called Experiences of the Tongue, while Ma Yanling features photos with women bound in silk ribbons in a series titled Silk Ribbons.

== Selected international exhibitions ==
- 2013 Galerie Wilms, Venlo, Netherlands
- 2006 Body Scape – Solo exhibition, VIP's International Art Galleries in cooperation with China Art Trade, Rotterdam, Netherlands
- 2005 100 International Artists, Casoria Contemporary Art Museum, Italy
- 2004 Between the Past and the Future, International Center of Photography, New York City
- 2002 Guangzhou Triennial Exhibition, Guangdong Museum of Art
- 2002 1st Chinese Art Triennial, Guangzhou Art Museum
- 2000 Fuck Off, Eastlink Gallery, Shanghai
- 1998 The Best of Chinese Contemporary, Proud Gallery, London
- 1994 Post-89, New Art of China, Marlborough Gallery, London
