= Buried Alive (performance) =

Performance series by monochrom

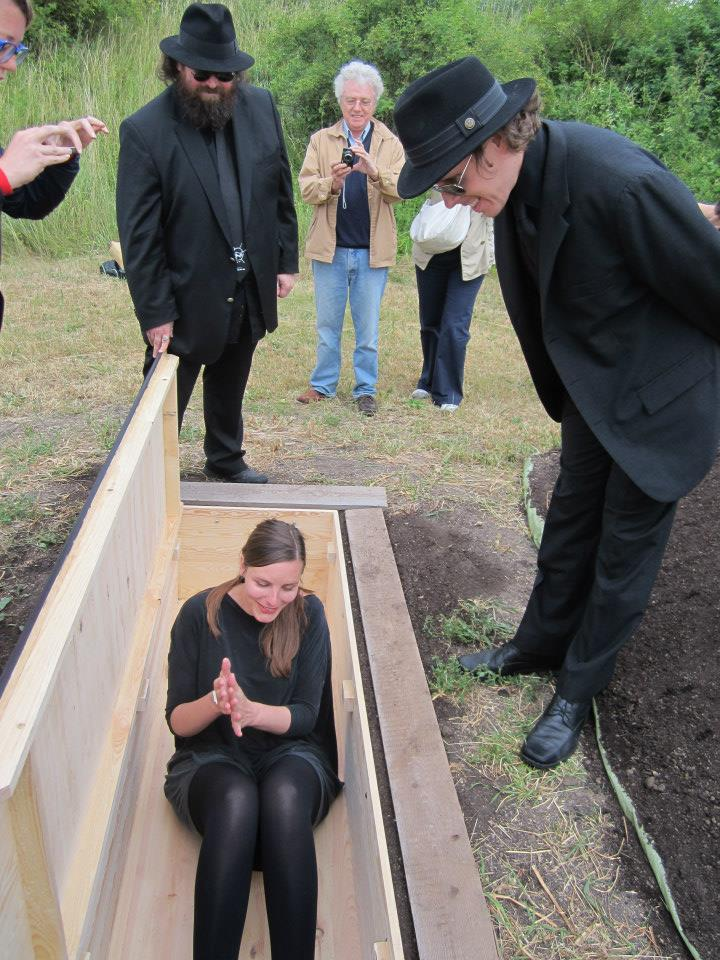
- monochrom's "Buried Alive" at VSL Lindabrunn 2013

Buried Alive is an art and lecture performance series by art-tech group monochrom. The basic concept is to offer willing participants the opportunity of being buried alive in a real coffin underground for fifteen to twenty minutes. As a framework program, monochrom offers lectures about the history of the science of determining death and the medical cultural history of premature burial. To date, they have buried around 600 people. The series has created controversy in some places it has been staged.

monochrom's founder and conceptualist Johannes Grenzfurthner states that the performance series wants to start a conversation about death, culture, medical and scientific myths and mass media. Grenzfurthner says that one of the inspirations for the performance series was the wish to deal with his claustrophobic tendencies.

Over the years the performance has attracted a lot of mainstream media coverage like the popular German TV show Joko gegen Klaas on Pro7 and the Austrian TV series Herr Ostrowski sucht das Glück on ORF.

== Performance ==
The first public burials were organized in 2005, 2006 and 2007 as part of a performance tour. People in Los Angeles (at Machine Project), San Francisco, Vancouver and Toronto had the opportunity to be buried alive in a real coffin for fifteen minutes. No cell phones, lamps or other devices were allowed inside the coffin. Participants had to sign a damage waiver. monochrom provided a 45 minute lecture about the history of premature burial and offered a set of different funeral marches and songs about death as "Death Jockeys".

== Six Feet Under Club ==
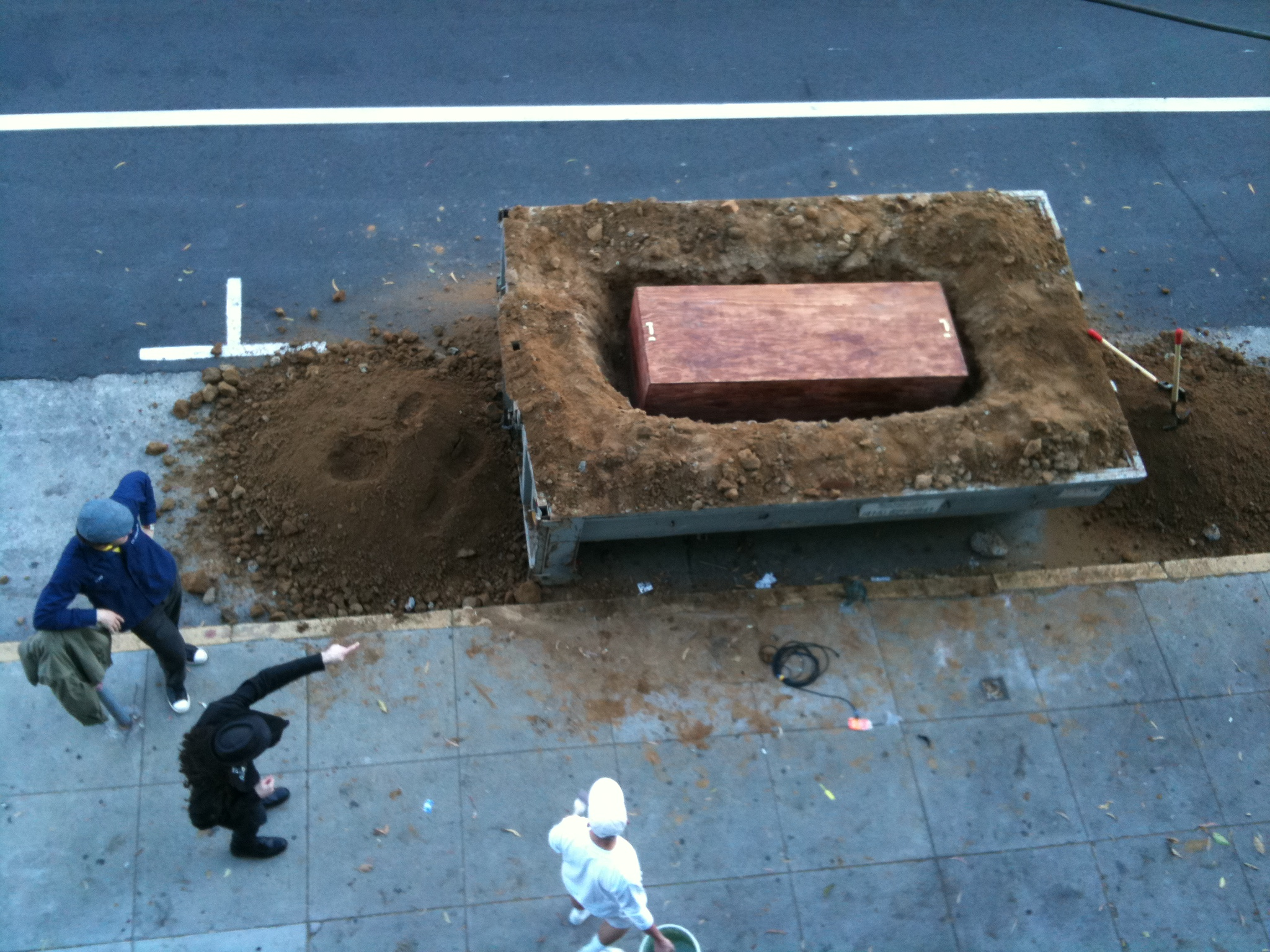
Preparations for monochrom's "Six Feet Under Club" (2010)

In 2010, monochrom updated the original concept and created the "Six Feet Under Club". Couples could volunteer to be buried together in a casket beneath the ground. In a press release they explained that the space they occupy is "extremely private and intimate". The coffin "is a reminder of the social norm of exclusive pair bonding 'till death do us part'." However, this intimate scene was corrupted by the presence of a night vision webcam which projects the scene on to an outside wall. The scenario kept the intimacy of a sexual moment intact while moving the private act into public space. monochrom's performance can be seen as an absurd parody of pornographic cinema or an examination of the high value placed on sexual privacy.

The performance was repeated at the Viennese club Schwelle 7 in 2013 and 2014.

== Installation ==
Since 2011 monochrom offers a constant burial site at VSL Lindabrunn in Lower Austria.
