= Shu Yang (artist) =

Shu Yang (Chinese: 舒阳; born 1969) is a Chinese painter, performance artist, photographer and curator who was born in Xi'an, China. He studied at the Xi’an Academy of Fine Art, where he received his BA in art in 1993 and his master's degree in 1996. He initially taught fine art at the Tianjin Institute of Urban Construction, before becoming an independent curator in 1999.

He moved to Beijing and in 2000, in collaboration with Chinese artist Zhu Ming and Chen Jin, set up the first performance art festival in China known as the Open Art Festival. In 2001 they curated the notorious festival of performance art in Cheng Du which was reported on Chinese television and in the press. It attracted the unwelcome attentions of the Chinese authorities. Amongst the artists to have performed there were Chinese artists, Zhu Yu, whose work involved killing a pig, Zhu Ming who works mainly with bubbles and Dai Guangyu, Singapore artist Lee Wen, Slovakia artist Jozsef Juhosz, a member of the performance art group Black Market International, American artist Skip Arnold, British artist Lennie Lee, Canadian artist André Éric Létourneau and Japanese artist Arai Shinichi.

In 2002 he co-curated the 3rd Open Arts Festival in Xian, China with Chen Jin and Xiang Xishi. Many important performance artists took part including Ai Weiwei, Lennie Lee, Seiji Shimoda, Huang Rui, Yue Luping and Wang Mai.

After a split with Chen Jin, Shu Yang organised the first Dadao Live Arts Festival in 2003, the largest performance art festival in Asia featuring works by Wang Chuyu, Liang Tao. Yang Zhichao, Lennie Lee, Cai Juan and JJ Xi, Lee Wen, Michael Mayhew, Hayley Newman, Kira O' Reilly, and Andre Stitt. He acted as the director of the annual festival until 2009. In 2006 the festival took place in the 798 Art Zone in Beijing.

In 2003, he took part as an independent curator of China-UK Arts Management Placement Programme at Visiting Arts in London and Chapter Arts Centre in Cardiff, UK. In 2004 he was a resident artist at the Chinese Arts Centre, Manchester, UK. He used his residency to research live arts in the UK & meet with artists who could take part in future Dadao festivals.

In 2005 Shu Yang organised 'China Live', a UK tour of performances and film screenings of performance work by Chinese artists. The show was exhibited in 8 galleries including the Chinese Arts Centre, Manchester; Arnolfini, Bristol; Bluecoat Arts Centre, Liverpool; Chapter Arts Centre, Cardiff; Colchester Arts Centre; Warwick Arts Centre in collaboration with Fierce, Coventry; Green Room, Manchester; Baltic, Gateshead; and Victoria and Albert Museum, London.

In addition to curating performance art festivals, Shu Yang is a well-known performer in his own right, has worked as an editor for Chinese art magazines and numerous catalogues. He is currently setting up the first archive of contemporary performance art in China. He has also curated numerous shows of photography, painting, video and movie in China, Germany, Italy and the UK.
