= Jean Dupuy (artist) =

American artist (1925–2021)

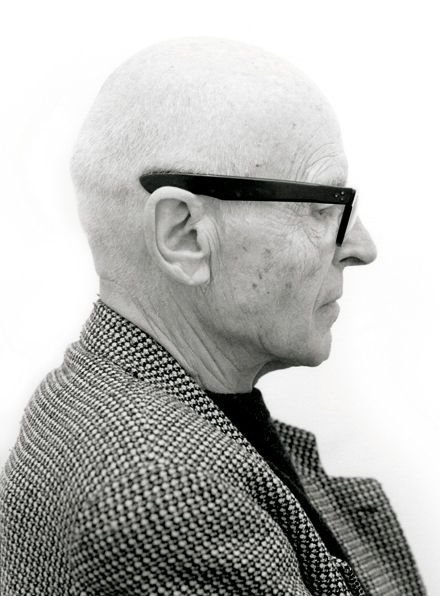
Jean Dupuy

Jean Dupuy (November 22, 1925 – April 4, 2021) was a French-born American artist and pioneer of work combining art and technology. He worked in the fields of conceptual art, performance art, painting, installations, sculptures, and video art. In the 1970s he curated many performance art events involving different artists from Fluxus, the New York's avant-garde and neo-dada scene. Many of his works are part of important collections, such as Centre Pompidou in Paris and the MAMAC of Nice.

== Works ==
Dupuy started his career as a painter, but in 1967 he destroyed most of his paintings by throwing them into the Seine. On moving to New York he exhibited his dust sculpture Heart Beats Dust (later renamed Cone Pyramid) at the Museum of Modern Art, as part of the 1968 exhibition The Machine as Seen at the End of the Mechanical Age, and at the Brooklyn Museum as part of the 1968 exhibition Some More Beginnings. The work, consisting of red dust set in motion by the viewer's heartbeat, inside a box, and made visible by a beam of light, won a competition arranged by Experiments in Art and Technology for collaborative work between artists and engineers.

His 1970 work FEWAFUEL was made in collaboration with engineers at Cummins and exhibited in the Art & Technology show at the Los Angeles County Museum of Art in 1971. In 1974 he organised the Soup & Tart performance event, at The Kitchen, in New York, which included contributions from Philip Glass, Gordon Matta-Clark, Joan Jonas, Richard Serra and Yvonne Rainer.

From 1976 he worked in close collaboration with George Maciunas. His works for Judson Church, Artists Space, P.S.1 and the Musée du Louvre were created in collaboration with artists such as Nam June Paik, Claes Oldenburg, Charlemagne Palestine, George Maciunas, Carolee Schneemann, Joan Jonas, Richard Serra, Gordon Matta-Clark, Robert Filliou, Jacques Monory, Charles Dreyfus Pechkoff, Laurie Anderson, Philip Glass, and Charlotte Moorman.

In 1978 he invited 40 artists to contribute One Minute Performances in front of different artworks at the Louvre.

In 2003 he had a solo exhibition at the Emily Harvey Foundation, where he exhibited anagrammatic texts and works made out of found stones.

Dupuy died in April 2021 at the age of 95.

== Bibliography ==
=== Monographs ===
- 2008 - En quatrième vitesse, Texts by Robert Bonaccorsi and Erik Verhagen, Semiose editions, Villa Arson, Villa Tamaris, MAMAC, Nice, FRAC Bourgogne, Dijon, (ISBN 978-2-915199-36-9).
- 2008 - À la bonne heure, Texts by Michel Giroud, Eric Mangion and Arnaud Labelle-Rojoux, Semiose editions, Villa Arson, Villa Tamaris, MAMAC (Nice), FRAC Bourgogne (Dijon), (ISBN 978-2-915199-35-2).
- 2008 - Rouge et Blanc, Semiose editions, 14 pages, color (ISBN 978-2-915199-39-0).
- 2008 - Sédimentations, FRAC Bourgogne Edition, color, (ISBN 978-2-913994-29-4).
- 2008 - Itératio, FRAC Bourgogne Edition, 64 pages, color, (ISBN 978-2-913994-29-4).
- 2006 - Les Tons de son cru, Co-edition FRAC Bourgogne & Ministère de la Culture, 700 exemplaries, 64 pages, color, (ISBN 978-2-913994-23-2).
- 2006 - Un ton de mon cru, Semiose editions, 82 pages, color, (ISBN 978-2-915199-20-8).
- 2003 - Anagram bookshop, Emily Harvey Gallery, New York, 48 pages, color, English.
- 2002 - Pierres, Co-edition FRAC Bourgogne & Ministère de la Culture, 1000 exemplaries, 45 pages, color, (ISBN 2-913994-09-1).
- 2002 - Mimi Lulu (Anagrammaire 2), Edition FRAC Bourgogne, 24 pages, color, (ISBN 2-913994-02-4).
- 2002 - Chez Olgadorno à Puerto Rico, Edition FRAC Bourgogne, 24 pages, color, (ISBN 2-913994-08-3).
- 2000 - Sans queue ni tête, Galerie Commune, Tourcoing, 56 pages, color, French/English, (ISBN 2-9514794-1-7).
- 1999 - Jean Dupuy chez Conz, Edition FRAC Bourgogne, 80 pages, black & white and color, French/English.
- 1997 - Anagrammaire, Edition A bruit secret, Dunkerque, 58 pages, color.
- 1997 - Sans titre - Titre : Sans Oeuvres, Francesco Milani, Verona, 65 pages, black & white and color.
- 1997 - L'art est ci, l'art est là, Francesco Milani, Verona, 65 pages, black & white and color.
- 1996 - The Stutterer, Edited by Mathieu Dupuy, Honfleur, limited édition of 101 numbered exemplaires, 25 pages, black & white and color, English.
- 1995 - Seconde vue, FRAC Auvergne, Clermont-Ferrand, 25 pages, black & white, (ISBN 2-907672-05-3).
- 1995 - Oh ! Oh ! Ah ?, Galerie Le Regard Sans Cran d'Arrêt, Dunkerque, Edition of 1000 exemplaries, 38 pages, color.
- 1994 - Le hasard, c'est moi, J & J Donguy, Paris, 50 pages, color.
- 1994 - Catalogue raisonnable de quelques oeuvres de Léon Bègue, J & J Donguy, 49 pages, color.
- 1990 - Un anagrammiste atteint de palilalie, J & J Donguy, Paris, 25 pages, color.
- 1989 - Léon, Edition Rainer Verlag, Berlin, with the support of Berliner Künstlerprogramm des Daad (German office of university exchanges), 85 pages, color, (ISBN 3-88537-098-0).
- 1987 - Ypudu anagrammiste, Christian Xatrec publication, New York, 192 pages, black & white and color, (ISBN 0-9619605-0-7).
- 1981 - Calais pas de calais, Galerie de l'Ancienne Poste, Calais, 48 pages, black & white.

=== Collective books ===
- 2012 - La Plasticité du Langage - à la Fondation Hippocrène, Beaux-Arts éditions, 50 pages, color, (ISBN 978-2-84278-958-9).
- 2010 - Le Printemps de Septembre à Toulouse, Edition le Printemps de Septembre, 159 pages, color, (ISBN 978-2-9533753-2-9).
- 1980 - Collective Consciousness: Art Performances in the Seventies, written by Jean Dupuy, Performing Arts Journal Publications, New York, Edition of 3000 exemplars, 245 pages, black & white, (ISBN 978-0933826274).
- 1968 - The Machine, Museum of Modern Art, New York, Texts by Karl Gunnar Pontus Hulten, 218 pages, black & white and blue monochrome, English.
- 1968 - Some More Beginnings, E.A.T., 122 pages, black & white, English.

== Listening ==
Le drapeau de George Maciunas, produced for the Canadian Broadcasting Corporation, Éditions Système Minuit, CD, Montreal (published in 2008)

== Public collections ==
- Fonds National d’Art Contemporain, Puteaux, France
- Centre Pompidou - Musée National d'Art Moderne, Paris, France
- Fonds Régional d'Art Contemporain Bretagne, Châteaugiron, France
- Fonds Régional d'Art Contemporain Bourgogne, Dijon, France
- MAC, Lyon, France
- The Barnes Foundation, New York, USA
- The Emily Harvey Foundation, New York, USA
- The Lannan Foundation, Miami, USA
- Universcience / La Cité des Sciences et de l'Industrie, Paris, France
