= Anna Friz =

Canadian artist and musician (born 1970)

- Born: 1970 (age 55–56); Vancouver, British Columbia, Canada
- Education: University of British Columbia, Concordia University
- Known for: sound art, radio art
- Notable work: Respire; You Are Far From Us (2006)
- Website: nicelittlestatic.com

Anna Friz (born 1970) is a Canadian artist and musician whose work often pertains to, and utilizes the medium of, sound and radio. Starting in 1993, Friz has been involved with campus-community radio stations across Canada, and also works as a sound designer for film and stage performance. She has contributed original programming to numerous Canadian campus-community stations such as CITR-FM, CKUT-FM and CKUW, as well as for the CBC and Kunstradio, Austria.

== Early life and education ==
Anna Friz was born in 1970 in Vancouver, British Columbia, Canada. She received her B.A. in Women's Studies at the University of British Columbia and her M.A. in Media Studies at Concordia University. In 2011 Friz earned her Ph.D. in the Joint Graduate Program in Communication and Culture from York University, her dissertation being, "The Radio of the Future Redux: Rethinking Transmission Through Experiments in Radio Art." From 2011-2013 Friz partook in a post-doctoral fellowship in the Department of Sound at the School of the Art Institute of Chicago. She is a founding member of the York University research collective L.O.T.: Experiments in Urban Research.

== Work ==
Much of Friz's work is what she describes as "radiophonic performance art," stemming from a 1998 workshop by Vancouver media artist Bobbi Kozinuk about the construction of Tetsuo Kogawa inspired mini radio transmitters.

Her installations often include large arrays of lo-fi radios and multichannel transmitters in an attempt to create a field of sound, which is disrupted by the movement of the viewer due to the simple technical construction of the radios. Though most of her installations are very conscious of audience interaction, a more composed work featured at the 2009 Nuit Blanche in Toronto was her piece Respire, a continuation of an earlier work entitled You Are Far From Us (2006), that utilized sixty-five radios and four transmitters for a sound performance in five movements, which included interviews with witnesses of gun violence.

Friz contributed in the sound design for the theatrical, spoken word, and musical performance Spin by Evalyn Parry, which premiered at Buddies in Bad Times Theatre in Toronto in 2009. .

=== Radio ===
Friz became actively involved in campus-community radio beginning in 1993 as part of a collectively hosted feminist radio show, Radio Free Women, which aired on CITR-FM until 1995.

She went on to become the Program Director at CITR from 1997 until 2000. In the last two years as director, Friz curated the station's 24 Hours of Radio Art, an annual broadcast made in celebration of Art's birthday.

In 2000 Friz relocated to Montreal and became a host on the satirical CKUT-FM show The Harvey Christ Radio Hour. The show turned into a performance called "Travelling Roadshow" for the 2005 Winnipeg Fringe Festival, and in the same year Cumulus Press published a book of comics and sermons written by the hosts.

== Installations and art works ==
Selected list of art and radio installations and works

- under lines (2015)
- Two Sleeps (2015)
- Telefunken Twins (2014-2015)
- Breakwater (2014)
- Trilogy for Night and Radio: Radiotelegraph, Night Fall, Relay (2013-2014)
- Drone Wedding (2014), commissioned by Ryerson University
- White Night (2014)
- What Isn't There (2014)
- Radiotelegraph (2013), commissioned by Radius
- Collecting Clocks and Losing Time (2012)
- Five Times (less a hundred) (2012)
- Zero Hour/Uncoordinated Universal Time (2012/2014)
- Tuner (2011)
- For the time being (2010), commissioned by the Äänen Lumo Festival for New Sounds
- Domestic Wireless, Dust (2009)
- Short Horizon (2008/2013)
- Extremity Cassette (2009)
- Respire (2008-2009)
- Dancing Walls Stir the Prairie (2007)
- The Joy Channel (2007/2009), commissioned for Radiovisionen: 250 Jahre Radio
- Somewhere a voice is calling (2007/2014)
- You Are Far From Us (2006-2008), commissioned for Radio Revolten
- The Secret Life of Radio (2005)
- Who are the people in the radio? (2005)
- Vacant City Radio (2005)
- The Automated Prayer Machine (2004)
- The Clandestine Transmissions of Pirate Jenny (2000/2002)
- There's a Risk of Arrest if You Turn Right (2001)
- Silence Descends (1999)
- B.E.A.R. (1998)
