= Janine Tagliante-Saracino =

Ivorian ambassador and public health professor

Janine Tagliante-Saracino is Ivorian diplomat, politician and public health professor.

== Biography ==
Tagliante-Saracino was born in Abidjan, Ivory Coast. She has served as Ambassador of the Ivory Coast to Bulgaria, Italy, Malta, Croatia and Greece. She is also a professor of Public Health and was Minister of Health and Public Hygiene (MSHP).
