= Rocío Boliver =

Mexican actor

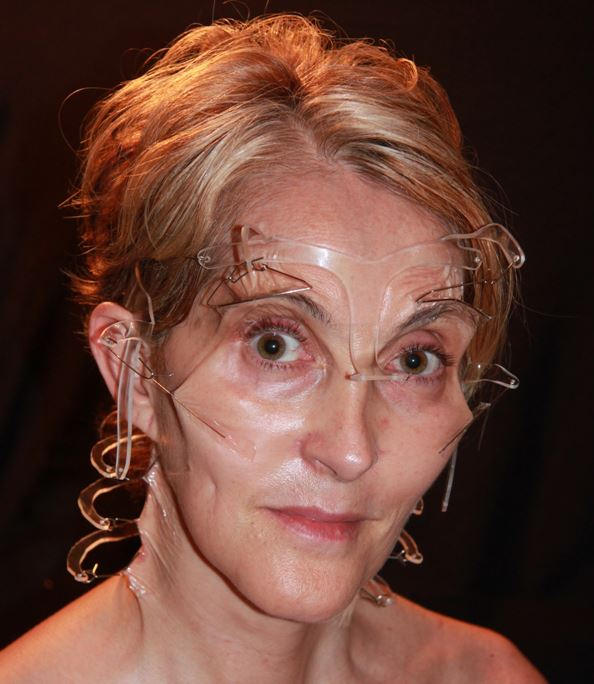
Rocío Boliver

Rocío Boliver is a Mexican performance artist who creates body art about gender, sexuality, pain and pleasure.

In 1992, Boliver began her career as a performance artist reading her porno-erotic writings. Boliver has a background in video and Mexican theatre. From 1994 to 2007 she worked in theatre projects, performance and contemporary art, collaborating with the playwright Juan José Gurrola . Boliver has performed at a variety of venues such as museums, raves, universities, galleries, activist meetings and TV programs. An underground cultural icon in Mexico, Boliver is part of a Goth-art scene, and has presented works at alternative forums such as the Sadomasochism National Festival. Boliver's work has presented in North America, South America, Europe and Asia.

== Biography ==
Rocío Boliver was born in Mexico City in 1956. Boliver studied dance and philosophy. In 1992, Boliver began reading her porno-erotic texts, which focus on sexually repressive ideologies towards Mexican women. From 1998 to 2008 Boliver collaborated with an electropanic music ensemble called Binaria, combining sound art and performance art. Boliver studied performance art at the Tisch School for the Arts, New York University with Richard Schechner, and history of performance in Arts Plastiques du Cégep de l'Abitibi, Quebec, Canada. In 2002, Boliver published her first book Saber Escoger. Boliver contributes writings to alternative sexual magazines and regularly lectures.

== Career ==
Boliver is known for provocative and often controversial performances. Her work has been featured in prominent Mexican institutions such as the Ex Teresa Arte Actual (INBA) and Museo Experimental El Eco (UNAM).[6] Throughout her career, she has received several notable grants and fellowships, including:

2013: National System of Creators scholarship, FONCA-CONACULTA. 2010: Residency Fellowship at Ladines, Art Research Center, Government of the Principality of Asturias, Spain. 2008: Cultural and Joint Investment Project scholarship, FONCA-CONACULTA, for the retrospective exhibition Sweet Sixteen and Still Virgin.[5]

Boliver has also conducted workshops on performance art internationally, teaching in cities such as Lisbon, New York, Barcelona, and Mexico City. Boliver teaches performance art workshops in Lisbon, New York, Barcelona and Mexico City.

== Allegation of Sexual Violence ==
Boliver's career has also been marred by an allegation of sexual violence during a public performance:

November 22, 2023: During the FAA Festival Arte/Acción, Boliver allegedly sexually assaulted fellow artist Xitlalli Treviño during a performance.

This incident sparked criticism and discussions about consent, ethics, and boundaries in performance art communities.

In May 2025, Boliver spoke about the November 2023 incident in an interview with Spanish artist RallitoX, acknowledging that she had physically touched Treviño during a performance without Treviño’s explicit consent. According to La Razón, Boliver admitted “I put my fingers in her,” while describing the act as part of an artistic response, and defended her actions as interpretive within the context of performance art. The Art/Action Festival has issued a statement expressing solidarity with Treviño and condemning the attack.
