= Zhang Shengquan =

Chinese artist (1955–2000)

- 张盛泉
- Born: 1955; Hebei, China
- Died: 2000 (aged 44–45); Datong, China
- Other names: Dazhang(大张), Datong Dazhang(大同大张)
- Occupations: Artist, poet
- Known for: Performance art

Zhang Shengquan (Chinese: 张盛泉), also known as Datong Da Zhang (Chinese: 大同大张), was a prominent figure in Chinese contemporary art, known for his performance art on topics of isolation and struggle. He was one of the main members in the art group W·R group.

== Early life; art career ==
Zhang was born in 1955 in Hebei province. In 1970, he enlisted in the military in Yunnan. After his four years' military service, Zhang went back to Datong and began working in a bank; meanwhile he started to explore various artistic disciplines, including vocal music and painting, and delved into art history and philosophy.

In the late 1980s, he formed the art group W·R group in Datong, which was known for its outdoor exhibitions. The group's work often touched on themes of life and struggle, reflecting Zhang's intense and sometimes controversial approach to art.

In 1989, Zhang and his group gained some attention for their unsanctioned participation in the First Modern Art Exhibition in China. Despite their efforts, the group struggled to gain recognition and acceptance within the contemporary art circles in Beijing.

Throughout the 1990s, Zhang continued his exploration in various art forms, including painting, installation art, performance art, and poetry. He began a practice he termed "Mail Art", where he sent sketches and ideas to artists and critics across the country, seeking engagement and dialogue.

In 2000, at the age of 45, Zhang ended his life in what he described as his final act of performance art. Influenced by a fortune-teller's prediction, this action at this time point had been recorded in Zhang's early art works. After his death, his poems, installation proposals, and notes were meticulously compiled and published by art critic Wen Pulin.

== Selected exhibitions ==
- 1986 – Datong, China – Datong Museum – My World – Oil Painting Exhibition (group)
- 1993 – Beijing, China – Ammonal Gallery, W·R Group '93 Exhibition
- 2009 – Beijing, China – The Wall Museum, The Journey Through Death – WR Group Retrospective Exhibition
- 2015 – Shanghai, China – Power Station of Art, Datong Dazhang
