= Zhu Yu (artist) =

Chinese conceptual artist (born 1970)

Zhu Yu 朱昱
- Born: 1970 (age 55–56); Chengdu, People's Republic of China
- Notable work: Cannibalism (食人); Sacrifice (献祭); Leftover

Zhu Yu (Chinese: 朱昱; pinyin: Zhū Yù; born 1970) is a performance artist living in Beijing, China. Zhu graduated from the Affiliated High School of the China Central Academy of Fine Arts in 1991. His work deals with subjects of contemporary art.

== Background ==
Zhu Yu is often termed the most controversial and criticized artist in China. Zhu graduated from the Affiliated High School of the Central Academy of Fine Arts in 1991. His contemporary performance art raises questions about moral agendas and draws an audience through its shock value. His artwork often encompasses the human body. He is categorized by some critics as an artist of the "cadaver school," which consists of artists who tend to use human body parts in their work.

Yu's most famous piece of conceptual art, titled "Eating People," was performed at a Shanghai arts festival in 2000. It consisted of him cooking and eating what is alleged to be a human fetus. The picture, circulated on the internet via e-mail in 2001, provoked investigations by both the FBI and Scotland Yard. It was intended as "shock art". Snopes and other urban legend sites have said the "fetus" used by Zhu Yu was most likely constructed from a duck's body and a doll's head. Other images from another art exhibit were falsely circulated along with Zhu Yu's photos and claimed to be evidence of fetus soup. The piece's cannibalistic theme caused a stir in Britain when Yu's work was featured on a Channel 4 documentary exploring Chinese Contemporary Art in 2003. In response to the public reaction, Mr. Yu stated, "No religion forbids cannibalism. Nor can I find any law which prevents us from eating people. I took advantage of the space between morality and the law and based my work on it". Yu created a fictional film in 2003 titled "Corpse Case" which was based on "Eating People". In it, the main character eats a fetus which was stolen from a medical school. Images from the piece have also been used in anti-Chinese propaganda, disseminated by e-mail and social media with a short text attached explaining the images show China's "hottest food" and that dead fetuses can be bought for 10–12,000 yen [sic] (approximately US$100–US$120). Recipients are encouraged to forward the mail, and the explanatory text is written in both English and Korean script. The Turkistan Islamic Party claimed that "Muslim children in Turkistan" were eaten by the Chinese, showing the faked pictures by Zhu Yu and photos of fake fetuses from an art exhibit.

== Exhibitions ==
Zhu Yu has been involved in many group exhibitions including Post-Sense Sensibility- Alien Bodies & Delusion in Beijing (January 1999), and The Third Guangzhou Triennial in Guangzhou (September 2008), which involved 181 artists from 40 countries.

Most notable is his work at the Fuck Off Exhibit curated by Ai Weiwei and Feng Boyi in Shanghai, 2000. This controversial exhibit hosted 48 contemporary avant-garde artists. This is where his most controversial piece of performance art "Eating People" appeared. Among his other solo exhibitions are Plaything (Long March Space, Beijing 2010) and Leftover (Xin Beijing Art Gallery, Beijing, 2007).

== Significant works ==
The Foundation of All Epistemology: This work appeared in the 1998 group exhibition It's All Right in Shanghai. For this piece, Zhu Yu cut and boiled five human brains which were purchased from a local hospital. He placed them in neatly labelled jars that he then signed with his own name. Zhu put these jars of brains up for sale in a market that sponsored the exhibit. He ended up selling 15 bottles each for the price of 98 yuans.

Eating People: In his performance art piece Eating People, Zhu photographs himself cooking and eating a human fetus that he divided into five parts. Zhu says that "I herewith announce my intention and my aim to eat people as a protest against mankind's moral idea that he/she cannot eat people." In further response to Zhu's performance, The Ministry of Culture cited a menace to social order and the spiritual health of the Chinese people, and banned exhibitions involving culture, animal abuse, corpses, and overt violence and sexuality. However, this piece did not even appear at the exhibit; the night before the exhibition, Ai Weiwei collaborated with Zhu and the photographs were removed from the gallery. This piece was thought particularly controversial, and organizers did not want to risk government censorship for the rest of the exhibit. The response to this work stemmed from its appearance on the internet shortly after. This later generated the question of whether eating babies was accepted in Asia on various myth-debunking websites. The authenticity of the fetus has also been called into question with some claiming it's an animal carcass with a doll parts.

Pocket Theology: Appearing in the 1999 group exhibition Post-Sense Sensibility- Alien Bodies & Delusion in Beijing, curated by Wu Meichun and Qiu Zhije. A long coiling rope was gripped by a severed, decomposing arm which was suspended by a meat hook. This display was held in a small room in the basement that was being rented by a group of Chinese artists who organised the exhibition. Viewers were forced to walk over the rope which filled the entire space.

Skin Graft: This performance art installation appeared in the 2000 exhibition Infatuation with Injury organized by Li Xianting. In the exhibit, Zhu uses his own flesh as a canvas. Photos were shown of the trunk of a quartered pig lying on a hospital bed. Zhu grafted a piece of his own skin onto a section of damaged skin from the pig. Two photos of this process appeared in the exhibit; one that showed the surgical process, and another which featured the artist sewing his own skin onto the pig carcass. Zhu stood by the exhibit and lifted his shirt to show the scar which stood as evidence of the procedure.

Leftover: This series was exhibited by the Xin Beijing Art Gallery at the China International Gallery Exposition. Zhu photographed plates that held bits of leftover food and then painted those images on canvas with oil. Eight paintings appeared at the Xin Beijing Art Gallery.

== Recent works ==
Zhu Yu's most recent works follow his ideas with the Leftover exhibit, in which he paints highly detailed portraits of mundane objects. His series "Stain," features a bird's-eye view of teacups that contain the dregs of tea leaves. The next series, "Pebble," appeared at Zhu's solo exhibition Play Thing, at the Long March Space in Beijing, 2010. This is another series of highly detailed, realistic paintings that show individual pebbles, each featuring a slightly different hue or shape. This work implies that all life can be reduced to a pebble, a simple object from which much meaning can be derived.

== Exhibitions ==
- Long March Space- Beijing@Sh Contemporary 2011: September 2011, Shanghai Exhibition Center, Shanghai
- "Top Events" 3rd Session- Poster Exhibition: September–October 2011, TOP Contemporary Art Center, Shanghai
- Long March Space@Art Beijing 2011 Contemporary Art Fair: April–May 2011, National Agriculture Exhibition Center, Beijing
- Long March Space@ShContemporary 2010 Shanghai Art Fait International: September 2010, Shanghai Exhibition Center, Shanghai
- Discoveries: Re-Value@ShContemporary 2010 Shanghai Art Fair International: September 2010, Shanghai Exhibition Center, Shanghai
- Great Performance: August–October 2010, Pace Beijing, Beijing
- Play Thing(Solo): April–May 2010, Long March Project, Beijing
- Jungle: A Close-up Focus on Chinese Contemporary Art Trends: March–May 2010, Platform Chinga Contemporary Art Institute Space A, Beijing
- Contemporary Art Exhibition in Songjiang: September 2009, Shanghai Songjiang Creative Studio, Shanghai
- Blackboard: May–June 2009, ShanghART Gallery, Shanghai
- Xin Beijing Art Gallery@ShContemporary 08: September 2008, Shanghai Exhibition Center
- "Insomnia" Photographs Exhibition: September 2008, BizArt Center, Shanghai
- The Third Guanzhou Triennial: September–November 2008, Guangdong Museum of Art, Guangzhou
- Portraying Food: June–July 2008, Walsh Gallery, Chicago
- Illegal Construction II: March–May 2008, Long March Project, Beijing
- Retrospective Exhibition I: January 2008, Xin Beijing Art Gallery, Beijing
- Exit/Entrance: September–October 2007, Xin Beijing Art Gallery, Beijing
- Xin Beijing Art Gallery@ShContemporary 07: September 2007, Shanghai Exhibition Center, Shanghai
- Leftover (Solo): August 2007, Xin Beijing Art Gallery, Beijing
- NONO: April–June 2007, Long March Project, Beijing
- It's All Right: December 2006, BizArt Center, Shanghai
- One Project Composed of 100 Projects (Solo): May 2006, BizArt Center, Shanghai
- Conspire: November–January 2005/2006, TS1 Gallery, Beijing
- Internal Injuries Part 1: July–September 2005, Primo Marella Gallery, Beijing
- Dial 62721232: 2004, BizArt Center, Beijing
- Nasty: October 2003, BizArt Center, Beijing
- Mushroom, Or Utopia: November–December 2002, The Bund Museum, Shanghai
- Fan Mingzhen and Fan Mingzhen: November 2002, BizArt Center, Beijing
- Fuck Off: November 2000, Shanghai Eastlink Gallery, Shanghai
- It's All Right: January 1998 – December 2006, BizArt Center, Beijing

== See also ==
- Child cannibalism
- Rick Gibson

== Other sources ==
- 5. Cheng, Meiling (2005) "Violent Capital: Zhu Yu on File." The Drama Review: The Journal of Performance Studies 49.3 (Fall): 58–77.
