= I Wayan Suweca =

I Wayan Suweca (born in the 1950s in Kayumas, Denpasar, Bali, Indonesia) is a highly respected performer of Balinese gamelan. Since the 1970s, he has taught and performed extensively throughout Asia, Europe, and America. In the early 1980s, along with his students Michael Tenzer and Rachel Ann Cooper, he founded and led the famous Sekar Jaya gamelan ensemble in Berkeley, California. In 1993, he cofounded the ensemble Giri Kedaton in Montreal. From 1982 to 2004, he was professor at the National Arts Academy of Indonesia (STSI) in Bali. From 1987 to 1993, he was a guest teacher at Université de Montréal in Canada and in Rochester, USA. For other students, See: List of music students by teacher: R to S#I Wayan Suweca.

I Wayan Suweca has received many awards and commissions from foundations, galleries, and art organizations. In 1992, he was commissioned by Diffusion Système Minuit du Québec to create a "kreasi baru kontemporer" (contemporary music composition) for gamelan entitled "Cyclus Kahidupan" (The Cycle of Life). The work was created at galerie Articule and was simultaneously broadcast on CKUT radio in Montreal, Quebec, Canada. He directed the Gamelan de l'Université de Montréal's special concert for the anniversary of the Paris International Exhibition in 1989, which was broadcast on Radio-Canada and Radio-France. He is also a noted composer, kendang performer, and renowned gamelan gender wayang performer. He appears on more than thirty CDs for various labels, including Bali Records and Nonesuch. In 2006, he began working on a wayang kulit project and intensely researching traditional Balinese kekawin singing.

== References and sources ==
- Still and Moving Lines in the Family of Hyperbolas, Liner Notes, LP, Lovely, USA, 1986
- AMERICAN WORKS FOR BALINESE GAMELAN ORCHESTRA, New World Records 80430, Liner Notes
- Gamelan: Indonesian Arts in America" Special issue of Ear Magazine, volume 8 number 4, September/October/November 1983
- Létourneau, André Éric, Retour de voyage en ces lieux oubliés de l'anéantissement, Galerie Articule, Montréal, 1992
- Létourneau, André Éric, Actions radiophoniques in. Inter #55, Éditions interncention, Québec, 1993
- Tenzer, Michael. Balinese Music. Tuttle Publishing; Subsequent edition (August 1998). ISBN 962-593-169-4. ISBN 978-962-593-169-2.
- Bali Sangga Dwipantara interview, 2021 (Bahasa Indonesia)

== Selected discography ==
- Gamelan Gender Wayang, Kayumas, CD, Bali Records
- STSI, Kreasi Baru, Bali Records
- Living Art, Sounding Spirit: The Bali Sessions, Rykodisc, USA, 1999
