= Feng Boyi =

Feng Boyi (Chinese: 馮博一; born 1960) is an independent art curator and critic in China. His work focusses primarily on contemporary Chinese art, working with museums and displaying art collections. He has worked several times with artist Ai Weiwei, publishing his journals illegally or working with him in exhibitions and has organized many controversial art exhibitions in China. He has been assistant editor of the China Artists' Association newsletter Artist's Communication since 1988. He has also edited and published numerous catalogues and papers on art and established the Artists' Alliance, a major online forum for contemporary art in China. Feng Boyi has been known to be an instigator to the up-and-coming contemporary art movement in Beijing, starting with publishing articles and journals from artists Ai Weiwei and Xu Bing.

== Early life ==
Feng Boyi was born in 1960 in Beijing, China, where he is still living today. During 1980 to 1984, he attended and graduated from the Department of History at Beijing Teachers' College (now Capital Normal University) in Beijing. After his graduation in 1984, he was assigned to work as an editor of The Artists' Bulletin, which was an internal publication for the Chinese Artists' Association. His interest in art led him to study in the Art History Department at the Central Academy of Fine Arts in 1991.

== Early career ==
Feng Boyi joined art visionaries in the early 1990s in Beijing as an independent art curator. This was also around the time he was learning at the Central Academy of Fine Arts. Despite being a curator, he admitted it was a difficult job: "'Nobody wants to curate shows, it's gruelling work,' he mumbles, tossing his ever-ringing cell phone from hand to hand."

He co-published a series of three books about the new generation of artists with Chinese artist Ai Weiwei: Black Cover Book (1994), White Cover Book (1995), and Gray Cover Book (1997). This series not only dealt with the topic of modern, contemporary art but also reflected the political ideas of Ai Weiwei.

Feng Boyi worked in Japan in 1994, where he played a role in a couple of exhibitions organized by the Fukuoka Art Museum, one of which being the 4th Asian Art Show. He was also part of a contemporary art exhibition in the Saitama Modern Art Museum.

In 1996, Feng Boyi was one of five organizers of one of the first contemporary art shows that was associated with the auction market. This show was called "Reality: Present and Future." It attracted much attention and led the way to more and more contemporary art shows and exhibits, which were not popular or open to the public.

Feng Boyi saw a pattern with new artists that were born in the 1980s, and he explained the possible reason why many of the contemporary Chinese artists today were born around the 1980s: "The fact that many artists born in the 1980s grew up as the center of attention and without brothers and sisters is one of the reasons why much of their work focuses on their inner minds." Young artists end up focusing on themselves and their inner emotions and are in need of trying to find ways to express themselves. As an art critic, Feng Boyi sees their art as a way for their emotions to be understood by others. Part of the reason was due to the fact that families could only have one child in China. All these only-children were often lonely and needed new mediums of expressing themselves, which eventually resulted in the attempting contemporary art that challenges society.

== Current career ==
Currently Feng Boyi is the art director and curator of the He Xiangning Art Museum in Shenzhen.

Feng Boyi has also edited and published catalogues and articles about art, and established an online art forum called The Artists' Alliance, which discusses contemporary art, which has become very well known and popular with netizens.

== Notable exhibitions ==
=== Traces of Existence: A Private Show of Contemporary Chinese Art ===
Feng Boyi claimed that his most successful show was in 1998, titled "Traces of Existence: A Private Show of Contemporary Chinese Art", which helped him become more well known in the art world.

=== Fuck Off ===
"Fuck Off" (Chinese: 不合作方式; pinyin: Bù Hézuò Fāngshì) was an art exhibition held by Feng Boyi and Ai Weiwei during the Third Shanghai Biennale in 2000. It was held in a Shanghai Eastlink Gallery warehouse and included 46 avant-garde contemporary Chinese artists. Even though there were many influential artists present at this exhibition, it was closed down by the Shanghai police before its original closing date due to its controversial content. Feng felt as though Chinese artists were just working for foreigners because the early Chinese contemporary art shows were being held in foreign countries. In co-curating the exhibition, Feng said, "We wanted to show the 'fuck off' style, not working for the government or in the style of western countries, but a third way." Its name was a loose and questionable translation of the exhibition's corresponding Chinese title: "The Uncooperative Attitude".

=== Beijing Afloat ===
"Beijing Afloat" was the opening exhibition of the 2002 Beijing Tokyo Art Projects (BTAP, 北京东京艺术工程) inside a 400 square metres (4,300 sq ft) m² division of Factory 798's main area. This was the first renovated space featuring the high arched ceilings that would become synonymous with Beijing's 798 Art Zone. The show drew a crowd of over 1,000 people and marked the beginning of the popular infatuation with the area.

=== Guangzhou Triennial ===
In 2002 Feng was one of the organizers for The 1st Guangzhou Triennial in Guangzhou.

=== Left Hand - Right Hand ===
In 2003, "Left Hand - Right Hand" showcased Chinese and East German sculptors at 798 Space and Daoyaolu Workshop A. Among the works was Sui Jianguo's enormous concrete sculpture "Mao's Right Hand", which is just what the name suggests, and an example of modern Chinese art's ironic reflections on history.

=== The Art Game ===
In 2006 Feng curated an interactive exhibition called "The Art Game" that was geared toward the younger generation. It featured sixteen avant-garde artists from China, South Korea, and Japan. One of the goals was to attract the younger generation and have them open their eyes to new, different styles of art. Feng Boyi commented, "Through this game-like exhibition, we hope to bring a new sense of the interactivity of art to the juvenile viewers and enable them to gain a new way of looking at art." Female artist Xiong Wenyun created a workshop for kindergartners titled Rainbow-Colored Pens: An Experimental Painting Class for Children. The drawing is supposed to be used as a way to tell a story and show expression. Viewers were even allowed to trade their old toys with the artists' childhood toys on display. Feng Boyi was attracted to this interesting concept of trying to open the minds of children to appreciate art starting at a young age.
