= Antonio Pio Saracino =

Italian architect and designer

- Born: San Marco in Lamis, Italy
- Education: Sapienza University of Rome
- Occupation: Architect
- Awards: 2007 American Architecture Award
- Buildings: Seed House; Diver's House

Antonio Pio Saracino (Italian pronunciation: [anˈtɔːnjo ˈpiːo saraˈtʃiːno]) is an Italian architect, sculptor, and designer based in New York City. He has designed monuments, buildings, and modern furniture, and several of his designs are part of the permanent collections of museums such the Brooklyn Museum, the Museum of Art and Design in New York City and the Powerhouse Museum in Sydney. Saracino's work has been shown in international exhibitions and received reviews in publications such as The New York Times and Architectural Digest. His statues The Guardians: Hero and Superhero are in Bryant Park in Manhattan. Vogue named him "among the most prolific Italian designers abroad."

== Biography ==
Saracino was born in 1976 in Apulia, in the south of Italy, and attended the La Sapienza University of Architecture in Rome, where he graduated with a master's degree in 2003. In 2004 he began collaborating with Steve Blatz, an architect based in New York. Saracino has created designs for several companies and individuals such as Eni, MTV Staying Alive Foundation, Bloomingdales, the Italian government, Matt Mitcham.

His work is in the permanent collections of museums, including the Brooklyn Museum, and has been shown in solo and group exhibitions in various countries. He has won several awards for his work and received accolades from ARTnews magazine and New Italian Blood.

The Museum of Arts and Design in New York showed work by Saracino in the 2013 exhibition Out of Hand: Materializing the Postdigital. In the same year, he was commissioned to design a public art project for Bryant Park, Manhattan, entitled The Guardians: Hero and Superhero. The project consisted of two 13-foot-high statues, one made of marble and one made of stainless steel, that depicted "legendary civic heroes". The first statue, The Guardians: Hero was inspired by Michelangelo's "David", and was created as a gift by the Italian Government and Eni to symbolize friendship between Italy and the United States.

== Reception ==
Saracino's work has been the focus of several reviews. Vogue reviewed him positively, remarking that Saracino was "among the most prolific Italian industrial designers abroad and has been beatified by serial accolades."

== Works ==
Saracino has designed buildings, monuments and modern furniture. A selection of his design include:

=== Projects ===
- Tribeca Penthouse, New York City, 2013
- Diver house, Sydney, 2010
- Seed House, Upstate NY, 2007
- Art Hotel (Concept study), New York City, 2007
- MaxWax Salon, New York City, 2009
- Tibi Boutique, New York City, 2006

=== Public art ===
- 2011: "GATE 150," Washington DC
- 2012: "The Globe," Los Angeles
- 2013: "The Arches of Hopes," New York City
- 2013: "City Within," Dubai
- 2013: "The Guardians: Hero and Superhero", New York City

=== Products ===
- Egg Shelves, 2012
- Pythagoras Bowl, 2011
- Star Chair / Armchair, 2013
- Star Coffee Table, 2013
- Leaf Chair, Edition, 2011
- Blossom Chair, Edition, 2010
- Deer Chair, Edition, 2011
- Molecular Chair, Edition, 2010
- Modular Chair, Edition, 2009
- Formula One Trophy, Eni, 2010-13

Permanent collections

- Ray Sofa, Edition, 2010, Permanent Collection Museum of Arts and Design, New York City
- Ray Chair, Edition, 2010, Permanent Collection Powerhouse Museum, Sydney
- Cervo Chair, Edition, 2010, Permanent Collection Brooklyn Museum, New York City

== See also ==
- Digital morphogenesis
