= Esea contemporary =

Art gallery in Manchester, England

Coordinates: 53°29′5″N 2°14′15″W

esea contemporary
- Type: Art gallery
- Traded as: Chinese View Arts Association, 1987–2000; Chinese Art Centre, 2000–2015; Centre for Chinese Contemporary Art, 2015–2022
- Industry: Arts
- Founded: 4 June 1987
- Headquarters: 13 Thomas Street, Manchester, England, M4 1EU,
- Revenue: £486,311
- Number of employees: 12
- Website: www.eseacontemporary.org

esea contemporary, formerly the Centre for Chinese Contemporary Art, is a contemporary art gallery based in Manchester, England. It is located on Thomas Street in Manchester's Northern Quarter, in the renovated part of the Smithfield Market Hall.

== History ==
=== Origins of the Chinese Arts Centre (1986–1989) ===
Programme for the Chinese View '86 festival

The origins of the CFCCA can be found in the Black Arts Movement of the late 1980s which highlighted the artistic plight of people of African, Caribbean, or South Asian origin yet often excluded artists of Chinese origin. In the mid-1980s, Amy Lai, an artist and radio producer based in Manchester, thought there was a general lack of Chinese cultural activities compared to events arranged by the Asian and Caribbean communities. Using her links at the Eastern Horizon radio programme, Lai organised Chinese View '86, a two-week festival celebrating Chinese culture. The aim of the festival was to "engage the local ethnically Chinese community with arts and education programmes that worked to explore Chinese cultural identity".

In June 1987, Lai, with Peter Chui, Jenny Clegg, and David Wong, founded the Chinese View Arts Association (CVAA), a charitable organisation with the mission to "advance the education of the public in all forms of Chinese culture". Working under the remit of the CVAA, Lai organised cultural activities across Manchester and north west England working with a group of local artists of Chinese heritage. The events aimed to develop a stronger sense of cultural identity within the local Chinese community by revitalising their interest in traditional arts and crafts, while also increasing awareness of the Chinese way of life in the general population. Lai's philosophy at the time was that the activities had to be "open door, inclusive, and involved in the mainstream community".

The members of the CVAA also felt that too few locally-born people of Chinese heritage were growing up with an understanding of, or skills in, traditional Chinese arts and crafts. To address this concern, they opened a Chinese cultural centre. The centre would provide cultural activities, aimed at both the local community and the wider population, to promote an appreciation of "Chinese life, culture, philosophy, and values", and act as a regional focus for information and advice about Chinese culture.

=== Chinese Arts Centre as a grass roots community centre (1989–1992) ===
The CVAA opened the Chinese Arts Centre on 21 October 1989, on the first floor of Frazer House, Charlotte Street, in Manchester's Chinatown. The centre was officially opened on 17 January 1990, by Diana, Princess of Wales.

The centre was originally built upon an ethos of fostering community cohesion between the local Chinese community in Manchester and other communities in the north west of England. The centre's educational programme was part of its commitment to promote Chinese culture to the local community and the north-west. The centre facilitated artist-led educational workshops and had a long relationship with local practitioners, such as Mary Tang and Cathy Wu.

The centre also held exhibitions and events which promoted Chinese arts and culture. Up until then, most exhibitions of "Chinese Arts" in Manchester had been curated and displayed by British collectors at venues such as the Manchester Art Gallery. Many of the centre's early exhibitions focused on local culturally-significant works as well as more national and international practitioners. In 1992 the centre held its first large scale contemporary art exhibition, Beyond the Chinese Takeaway, which reflected on the experience of second and third generation British Chinese artists. The leaflet for the exhibition stated that it was "the first exhibition of its kind researching the innovative works of contemporary artists of Chinese origin living in Britain" and worked to "challenge the stereotypes" of the Chinese community.

=== Reviewing the focus of the centre (1993–1996) ===
A review of the organisation in 1993 by external consultants found that the centre had "consistently fallen well short of fulfilling its purpose" and the general perception was that the organisation was on "borrowed time". The centre was relaunched in October 1993 with a renewed mission to promote a wide range of traditional and contemporary art forms and would use its artistic and education programmes to progress how Chinese culture was perceived in the UK. The organisation also began to reposition itself as a development agency for emerging artists and art makers of Chinese heritage. As a part of the relaunch, the centre arranged a city-wide series of events to mark Chinese New Year in 1994, featuring activities at the centre, the greenroom, Cornerhouse, and the Dancehouse theatre. The centre also programmed the Journey's West exhibition, which was initiated by the Lambeth Chinese Community Association.

In 1994 the CVAA introduced an arts worker training scheme and activities targeted at the local community to address its staffing problems and to strengthen its links with the local community. The new ways of working were tested between September 1995 and March 1996 whilst the centre was one of the hosts of the British Art Show 4 and during their lunar new year activities. During the British Art Show, the centre displayed works by British artist Mat Collishaw. The hosts of the show had no say in the artists selected for their venues, but the acting director of the centre at the time, Kwong Lee, later stated that the increased exposure and the chance for the centre to have a temporary place at the centre of the art world justified programming an exhibition which did not feature the work of an artist of Chinese heritage.

Around this time, the CVAA discovered that their 1996–1997 grant from their core funder, the North West Arts Board (NWAB), was to be almost halved. It was agreed that the centre could no longer operate in its current form, and the Board of the CVAA began to look for a new venue and strategic lead for the centre. In June 1996, Sarah Champion became the centre's Arts Development Coordinator. Champion later stated that she was given six months to make the centre a success or close it down. The centre's new mission and objectives were finalised and five key development areas were established: education; artists development; the Chinese community; arts promotion; and advocacy and lobbying.

=== A national agency for Chinese arts (1997–2003) ===
Champion became the director of the centre when it moved to new premises on Edge Street in Manchester's Northern Quarter in 1997. This was a period of great change in the centre's functions and focus. More opportunities became available due to both the policies of the new Labour government, who placed greater emphasis on the importance of culture, and the increased interest in Chinese culture due to the upcoming Handover of Hong Kong. By moving away from Chinatown, the centre also became less focused on the local Chinese community; instead focusing more on contemporary art. It was also Champion's aim that the centre would work towards becoming the UK agency for Chinese arts and culture. The centre would operate as an agency from 1999 and the charity was renamed the Chinese Arts Centre Ltd in September 2000.

UK-based artists remained the main focus of the centre's exhibition programme during this period. Initially, the centre's programme largely featured solo shows of existing works by artists such as Adam Hongshan Wei and Anthony Key, or touring exhibitions, such as Nora Fok's Galaxies. When the venue was refurbished after a fire in 1998, the centre began to commission new site specific works by UK-based artists of east Asian heritage to use the new space to its best advantage. Between 2000 and 2003, the New Commissions scheme produced eight exhibitions by emerging artists such as Suki Chan, Lisa Cheung, Gayle Chong Kwan, and Jiang Jiehong.

As part of its agency work, the centre extended the scope of its educational workshops to a national audience and acted as a focal point for other businesses and art organisations who wanted to know more about Chinese culture. The centre began to contribute to debates regarding Chinese arts by arranging conferences such as A New Vocabulary for Chinese Arts?, held in London in 1998, and Contemporary Chinese Art in the International Arena held at the British Museum in 2002.

The centre also began to develop global contacts to introduce international artists to UK audiences. In 1997 Champion undertook a research trip to China with the aim of introducing the centre to international audiences and developing partnerships with organisations in mainland China. As a result, the centre produced Representing the People (1999), its first major touring exhibition to feature works by artists from mainland China. Developed in collaboration with the Courtyard gallery, Beijing, the exhibition was seen by approximately 250,000 people, and has been seen as one of the first independent UK exhibition to present the work of artists from Mainland China. This was followed by a second touring show, Made in China (2001–2002) which showcased contemporary design from China.

In June 2001, the centre was informed that it had been accepted on to the Arts Council of England's lottery programme and £2.1 million was reserved for the centre to purchase and outfit a new building, as well as fund the operations and marketing of the new venue.

=== Chinese Art Centre, Thomas Street, (2003–2013) ===
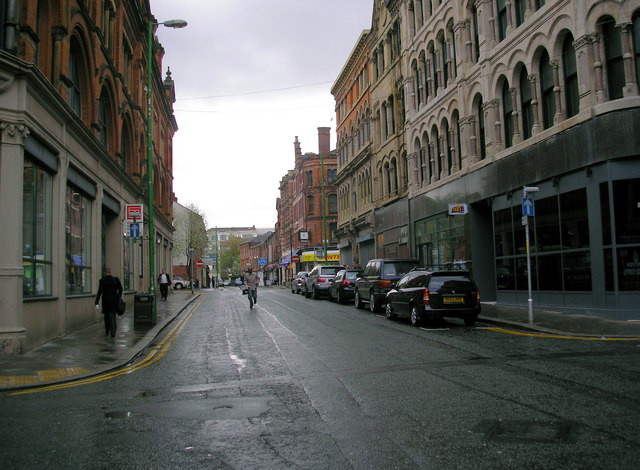
Chinese Art Centre on the left in 2008

The new venue on Thomas Street opened on 28 November 2003, after the organisation had received a £2.2 million lottery grant from Arts Council England. The new building, designed by OMI Architects and awarded a RIBA prize for architecture in 2004, featured a large gallery space, teahouse, shop, offices, resource area, and studio and living area for resident artists. The centre opened with a specially-commissioned work by New York-based artist, Xu Bing. Champion stated at the time that the organisation had remained in the Northern Quarter as the centre represented "a younger British/Chinese and International Chinese artists who tend to produce much more contemporary work", the venue was better placed in an "arts and cultural setting rather than a Chinatown setting".

Between 2005 and 2007, the centre developed a relationship with Live Art UK to promote the work of performance artists from China and the Chinese diaspora. As a result, the centre organised the China Live tour in collaboration with Shu Yang, director of the DaDao Live Art Festival, Beijing., and the VITAL Festivals in 2006–2007. The Festivals presented Live Art performances, film screenings, and artists' talks, presentations, and a conference associated with performance artists from China and of Chinese heritage.

=== Centre for Chinese Contemporary Art (2013–2020) ===
In October 2013, the Chinese Arts Centre became the Centre for Chinese Contemporary Art (CFCCA), cementing the organisation position as:

"future-facing organisation responding to China's growing cultural and economic influence".

During this period the centre focused its programming and curatorial activities on "The Chinese Century", an idea that the 21st century would be one dominated culturally and economically, not by western powers, but by China. Becky Kennedy observes that this notion calls for a shift away from considering Britain or the West as the centre of contemporary cultural thinking, and as suggested by the CFCCA's new mission statement, implies that issues of diversity and representation in the context of 21st century Britain are outmoded and/or have even been reversed.

In 2013 CFCCA formed a collaborative partnership with the University of Salford to build a collection of Chinese Contemporary Art in Salford. The collection would include works by international artists and would be developed with input from the curators at CFCCA and academics at the University of Salford. In the same year, CFCCA developed their relationships with local and national government, which lead to CFCCA being the launch venue of the Manchester China Forum co-hosted by CFCCA's curator Ying Tan and the then Chancellor of the Exchequer and Conservative MP, George Osborne. The event was widely seen as a bid to bring Chinese investment into the city as part of Osborne's vision for a Northern Powerhouse.

=== Revisioning and rebranding as esea contemporary (2020–present) ===
Following public accusations of racism made against the centre in early 2020, and the withdrawal of several artists from exhibitions in 2020, CFCCA embarked on a 'Revisioning' project to help shift the organisation towards better practices and positive change. As part of this project, CFCCA appointed a working group of artists to help co-design the new organisation. The group, who were all of East or Southeast Asian heritage, was formed of Enoch Cheng, Whiskey Chow, Yuen Ling Fong Gayle Chong Kwan, Eelyn Lee, Erika Tan, and Jack Tan. The artist working group was later dismissed after raising concerns of institutional racism, and following an accusation from the centre that the artists' complaints were harmful and threatening to white staff. The artists highlighted a concern previously raised by the artist JJ Chan, that CFCCA normalised racism within its own organisation and contributed to the normalisation of racism in British society more widely. Under the new leadership, the organisation rebranded as esea contemporary (referring to the term ESEA and its broader focus on art from diaspora communities) in 2023 and announced a new slate of exhibits that year, the first since the centre's closure in 2021.

== Controversies and criticisms of the centre ==
The centre has faced criticism over its focus and the content of its programme:

- In the early 1990s, the centre made an effort to remain politically neutral so as not to exclude any member of the east Asia diaspora due to their origins. However, the review in 1993 highlighted that this had affected the status of the centre as it had developed a reputation of not dealing with anything political. As a result, some artists and art organisations avoided the centre as they felt its stance was a form of censorship.
- After the move to Edge Street, the centre moved away from its original community focus, which has been seen to have alienated members of Manchester's Chinese community. In its recent history, the centre has begun to try to bridge the gap and gain back trust from the community which originally founded the centre.
- In March 2020, artist JJ Chan issued an open letter to the centre, highlighting the artist's perceptions of systemic problems with the centre and how the dominant voices in conversations in the UK about 'Chinese' arts were predominately white voices. The criticism was expanded further in an article in ArtAsiaPacific magazine.
- In May 2021, an international panel of artists, who were recruited to an Artist Working Group set up by the centre to help revision the organisation, called for a public boycott and immediate defunding of the centre by Arts Council England, after the group was ousted from their roles after raising issues around institutional racism at the centre. At the time, the organisation received £287,481 a year in public funding. All seven artists appointed to the Artist Working Group cited CFCCA's refusal to acknowledge a culture of racism within the organisation following the writing of a public report on the organisation's work, as the reason for their public campaign. The group claimed that the centre was not fit for purpose as a public arts organisation.
- In June 2021, following further reports of racism at the centre from artists internationally, as well as former and current members staff, all members of the board of trustees who were not white resigned from their voluntary roles, with the exception of one.
- In November 2021, Vice World News reported that the centre cancelled a planned public discussion panel tackling institutional racism, due to what the director had called the centre's own "white fragility". The comment was widely criticised by artists, and the centre has not reopened any exhibitions since the cancellation of the event.

== Collections ==
=== Art collection ===
Since 2013, the centre has worked in partnership with the University of Salford to build a collection of Chinese contemporary art works. The collection is held by the Salford Museum and Art Gallery.

=== Archive and library ===
Following a project funded by the Heritage Lottery Fund, the centre opened its library and archive to the public in 2018. The library contains publications collected by the centre relating to Chinese contemporary art, including exhibition catalogues, artist monographs, and festival publications. The archive collections contain the record of the centre and its predecessors, covering the development of the centre, and its programme history.

== Notable artists who exhibited at the centre ==
- Cao Fei
- Carol Yinghua Lu
- Chen Man
- Chen Shaoxiong
- Chow Chun Fai
- Conroy Sanderson
- Ed Pien
- Gordon Cheung
- Lesley Sanderson
- Mad for Real
- He Chengyao
- Suki Chan
- Xu Bing
