= He Yunchang =

Chinese performance artist

- Born: 1967 (age 57–58); Kunming, China
- Occupation: Performance artist

He Yunchang (born 1967), also known as A Chang, is a Chinese performance artist known for works of endurance.

== Life and career ==
He Yunchang was born in Kunming, southwest China, in 1967. He graduated from the Yunnan Art Institute in 1991 with a degree in oil painting and moved to Beijing in 1998, where he developed conceptual performances. Often held in nature and contrasting the natural world with the body's limits, his performances were based on He's ideas of space and time. Most of the performances had no outcome. His original performances were held in Kunming, but eventually expanded to Beijing. His 1999 Kunming performance Dialogue with Water is documented with the artist dangling from a crane above an active river, extending a knife to cut the river's flow. In Wrestle: One and One Hundred (2001), He wrestled one hundred Kunming men and mostly lost. Despite his failures, the works became mythical in their audacity, like folklore.

He is known for his endurance performance works. In 2004, he cemented himself in a block for a day. In 2007, he carried a rock around the perimeter of the island of Great Britain, returning the rock to the place he picked it up. In He's One Meter Democracy (2010), he proposed that he would cut himself one meter from his clavicle to his knee and held a pseudo-democratic vote as to whether he would continue with the procedure. The majority voted in favor and a medical doctor performed the cut. In March 2012, he began sleeping outside in Caochangdi until the grass grew. The work was documented through social media. He's Conversation with the River shows a documentary photograph featuring the artist dangling upside down from a crane over a river.

== Exhibitions ==
Chambers Fine Art hosted his first American solo show in December 2007. He was one of seven Chinese artists representing the country at the 2013 Venice Biennale. In The Water of Venice, he filled 2,013 numbered and signed bottles of seawater. In 2021, Yunchang is having his first major solo show in Europe, at the Francisco Carolinum in Linz, Austria, entitled He Yunchang - Golden Sunshine. The exhibition will be curated by Ai Weiwei.
