= List of performance artists =

Performance art is a performance presented to an audience within a fine art context, traditionally interdisciplinary. Performance may be either scripted or unscripted, random or carefully orchestrated; spontaneous or otherwise carefully planned with or without audience participation.

This article lists notable performance artists.

== A ==
- Marina Abramović
- Vito Acconci
- Derrick Adams
- Theo Adams
- Bas Jan Ader
- Terry Adkins
- Laurie Anderson
- Eleanor Antin
- Marcel·lí Antúnez Roca
- Marilyn Arsem
- Ron Athey
- Abel Azcona

== B ==
- Franko B
- Magali Babin
- Gretchen Baer
- Blažej Baláž
- Matthew Barney
- Vanessa Beecroft
- Katherine Behar
- Rebecca Belmore
- Joseph Beuys
- Black Market International (BMI)
- Nicole Blackman
- Guy Bleus
- Mark Bloch
- Blue Man Group
- Kate Bornstein
- Leigh Bowery
- George Brecht
- Alexander Brener
- Stuart Brisley
- Robert Delford Brown
- Günter Brus
- Nancy Buchanan
- Chris Burden
- Nia Burks
- Józef Bury
- James Lee Byars

== C ==
- Cabaret Voltaire
- Meryn Cadell
- Sophie Calle
- Lisa Crystal Carver (Lisa Suckdog)
- Giuseppe Chiari
- Katherine Chronis
- Yuan Chai and Jian Jun Xi
- Marko Ciciliani
- Keith Cole
- Papo Colo
- Janani Cooray
- Costes
- COUM Transmissions (later Throbbing Gristle)

== D ==
- D Underbelly
- Bill Dan
- Dancenoise
- Vaginal Davis
- Robin Deacon
- Danny Devos
- Jess Dobkin
- Marco Donnarumma
- Doorika
- Die Tödliche Doris
- John Duncan

== E ==
- Rafa Esparza
- EXIT (members Penny Rimbaud and Gee Vaucher later formed Crass)
- Valie Export

== F ==
- Zachary Fabri
- Deej Fabyc
- John Fare
- Brian Feldman
- Esther Ferrer
- Nathan Fielder
- Karen Finley
- Bob Flanagan
- Terry Fox
- Andrea Fraser
- Coco Fusco
- Chiara Fumai

== G ==
- Diamanda Galás
- Regina José Galindo
- Richard Gallo
- Harry Gamboa, Jr.
- Cheri Gaulke
- Jochen Gerz
- Gilbert and George
- Gob Squad
- Jack Goldstein
- Guillermo Gomez-Peña
- Hedwig Gorski
- Annabel Guérédrat and Henri Tauliaut
- Nadia Granados
- Johannes Grenzfurthner
- Peter Grzybowski

== H ==
- Lyn Hagan
- David Hammons
- Trenton Doyle Hancock
- Lyle Ashton Harris
- Maren Hassinger
- Vladimír Havlík
- Sharon Hayes
- Andreas Heusser
- Amy Hill
- EJ Hill
- Tehching Hsieh
- Dick Higgins
- Zhang Huan
- Holly Hughes
- Dan Hurlin

== I ==
- Industry of the Ordinary

== J ==
- Joan Jonas
- Jerma985
- Jelili Atiku
- Kim Jones
- Juliacks
- Miranda July
- Colette Justine
- Zuzanna Janin

== K ==
- Alex Kahn
- Istvan Kantor
- Allan Kaprow
- Andy Kaufman
- Jonathon Keats
- Mike Kelley
- The Kipper Kids
- Kimsooja
- Ragnar Kjartansson
- Norbert Klassen
- Yves Klein
- Alison Knowles
- Mitchell Kriegman
- Yayoi Kusama
- Dan Kwong
- Siglinde Kallnbach

== L ==
- Tony Labat
- LaBeouf, Rönkkö & Turner
- Suzanne Lacy
- Maria Lalou
- LasTesis
- Lennie Lee
- Jorge de León
- Shaun El C. Leonardo
- David Leslie
- André Éric Létourneau
- Roberta Lima
- Kalup Linzy
- Artyom Loskutov
- James Luna
- Lydia Lunch

== M ==
- Alastair MacLennan
- Ann Magnuson
- Miki Malör
- Diane Mantzaris
- Deb Margolin
- María Evelia Marmolejo
- Gordon Matta-Clark
- Paul McCarthy
- Martha McDonald
- Mark McGowan
- Rita McKeough
- Dave McKenzie
- Elle Mehrmand
- Ana Mendieta
- Gabrielle Miller
- Tom Miller
- Eric Millikin
- Marta Minujín
- Orlando Mohorovic
- Linda Montano
- Frank Moore
- Charlotte Moorman
- Mr. Pacman
- Otto Muehl
- Tom Murrin

== N ==
- Mem Nahadr
- Bruce Nauman
- Senga Nengudi
- Josef Ng
- Lane Nishikawa
- Hermann Nitsch
- Tameka Norris
- Nsumi

== O ==
- Martin O'Brien
- Lorraine O’Grady
- Pat Oleszko
- Marisa Olson
- Roman Ondák
- Yoko Ono
- Dennis Oppenheim
- Jill Orr
- Orlan
- Tanja Ostojic
- Clifford Owens

== P ==
- Nam June Paik
- Gina Pane
- Rebecca Patek
- Petr Pavlensky
- Sarah Jane Pell
- Adam Pendleton
- PINK de Thierry
- Adrian Piper
- William Pope.L
- Genesis P-Orridge
- Michael Portnoy

== R ==
- Walid Raad
- Rammellzee
- Nelda Ramos
- Charles Recher
- Eric-Paul Riege
- Jatun Risba
- Rachel Rosenthal
- Kira O' Reilly
- Jesusa Rodríguez
- Martha Rosler
- Monica Ross

== S ==
- Bryan Lewis Saunders
- Carolee Schneemann
- HA Schult
- Rudolf Schwarzkogler
- Erica Scourti
- Arleen Schloss
- Dread Scott
- Tino Sehgal
- David Sherry (artist)
- Shu Yang
- Willoughby Sharp
- Shozo Shimamoto
- Aliza Shvarts
- Lián Amaris Sifuentes
- Xaviera Simmons
- Vasan Sitthiket
- Joey Skaggs
- Barbara T. Smith
- Jack Smith
- Michael Smith
- Annegret Soltau
- Antonieta Sosa
- Annie Sprinkle
- Stevie Starr
- Stelarc
- Andre Stitt
- Angela Su
- Survival Research Laboratories
- Melati Suryodarmo

== T ==
- Reverend Billy and the Church of Life After Shopping
- Elena Tejada-Herrera
- Slaven Tolj
- Julie Tolentino
- Alessandra Torres
- Carmelita Tropicana
- Natasha Tsakos
- Wu Tsang
- Artur Tajber

== U ==
- Ulay

== V ==
- Armand Vaillancourt
- David Van Tieghem
- Natacha Voliakovsky
- Wolf Vostell
- VestAndPage
- Victor Dada

== W ==
- Monika Weiss
- Lee Wen
- Hannah Wilke
- David Wojnarowicz
- The World Famous Bushman
- John M. White

== X ==
- Márcia X

== Y ==
- Nil Yalter
- Yamantaka // Sonic Titan
- Yang Zhichao
- Yes Men
- Hennessy Youngman (aka Jayson Musson)

== Z ==
- Vahram Zaryan
- Zhu Yu
- Zheng Lianjie
