= Le Tas Invisible =

Canadian art collective

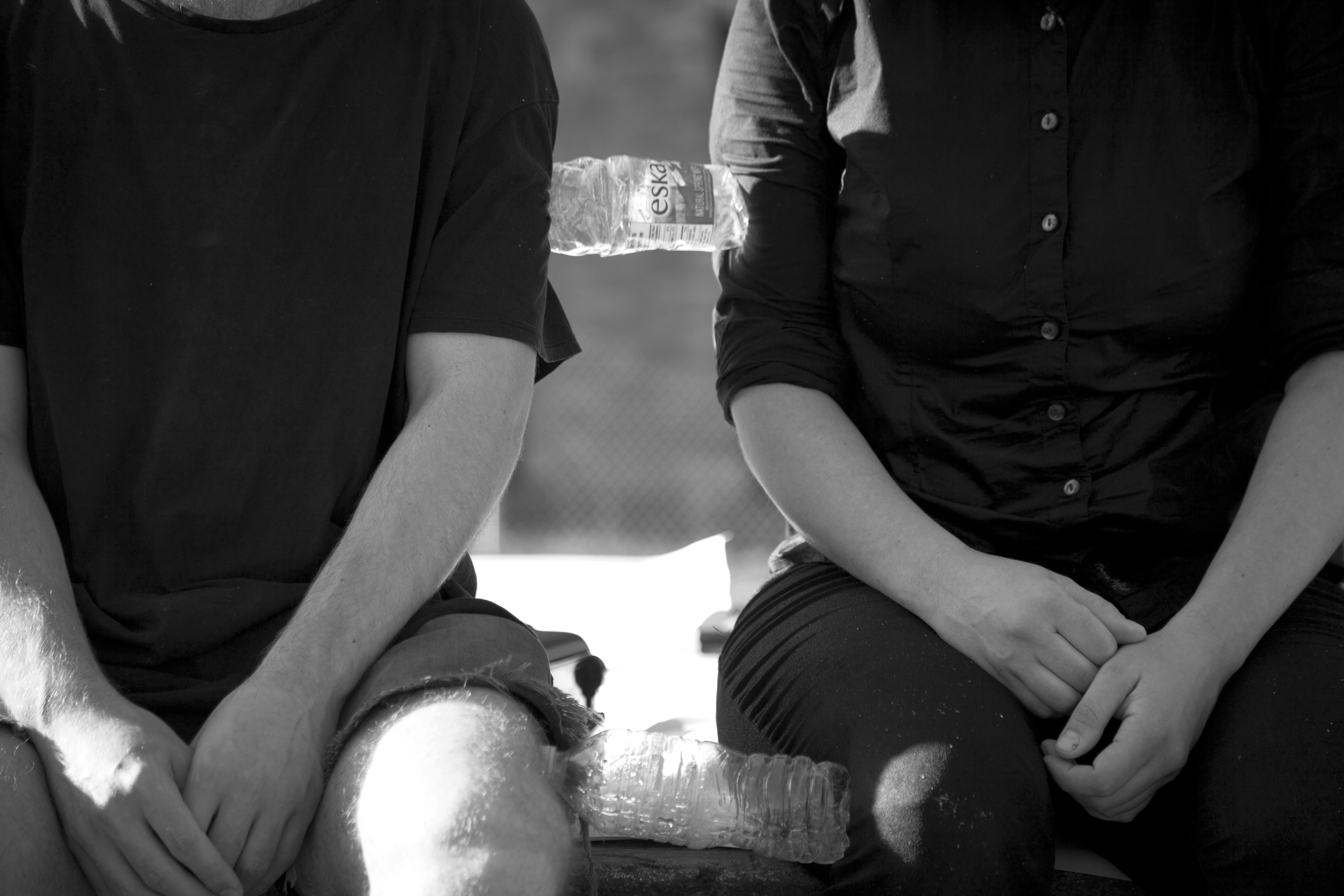

Le Tas Invisible is a collective that creates furtive and improvised group performances in public space. Founded in 2013 in Quebec City, the collective grounds its collaborative performance art practice in questions about invisibility and visibility through action art in cities. Geographically dispersed, the members of the collective produce simultaneous actions in the different cities within the metropolitan areas and regions of Canada, primarily in the provinces of Quebec and Ontario. Active on a monthly basis since 2013, the collective infiltrates variable and varied public spaces.

Bringing together individuals around the aesthetic and political principles of taking action, invisibility and community, since 2016, Le Tas Invisible has been participating in Equinox to Equinox. These are global manifestations presenting simultaneous collective performances within public spaces, organized in conjunction with the Bbeyond performance collective, (Belfast, Northern Ireland) with more than thirty like-minded collectives dispersed in different cities of several countries around the world.

As an art collective practicing action art within the public spaces, Le Tas Invisible includes a number of specificities (see the section below that is devoted to these characteristics). Please note that, in this Wiki entry, certain names and places are purposely left anonymous. This is aligned with the aesthetic and political mission of the invisible collective and its critique of institutional visibility, self-promotion and their systemic conventions

== Declaration of Guiding Principles ==
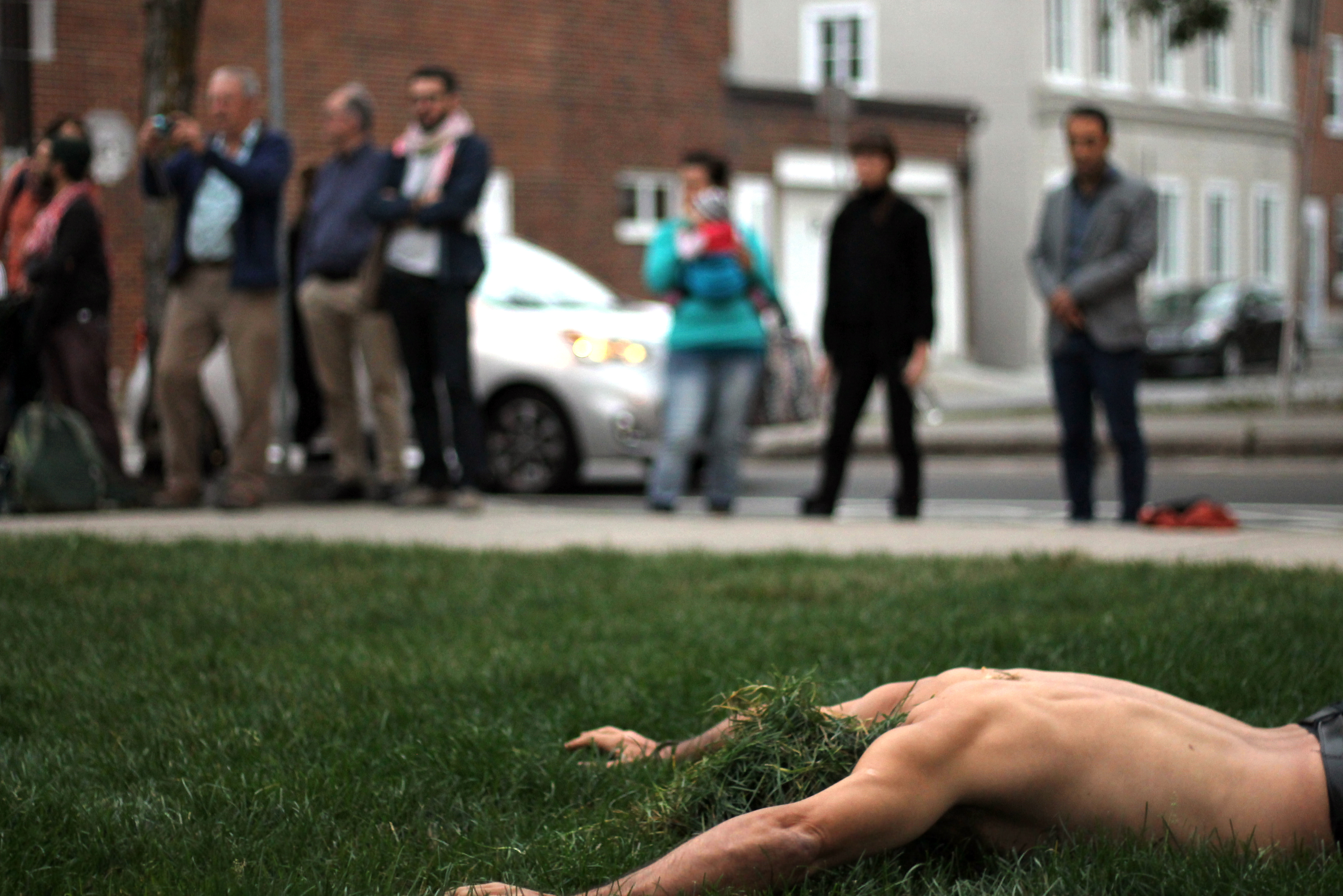

Le Tas Invisible is mainly an inquiry into the persistent existence of secretive interventions, presented on the margins; about invisibility in public and alternative spaces; and on questions of stealthy collective actions, where only simultaneity and modalities ensure the conceptual unity of the actions in the geographical fragmentation of the collective. The essential point that seems to emerge from the participatory and furtive experience of these meetings is based on its intersubjective, nourishing and exploratory aspects that rally at each subsequent meeting. Le Tas Invisible tends to make room for the freedom of, by and for art in our lives.

— An Invisible, 2016

== History ==
Tas Invisible, Being in Public, Equinox to Equinox, Quebec 2016

The collective, Le Tas Invisible, was founded in 2013 following a performance art workshop led by Alastair MacLennan, the Scottish-born performance artist who help found Bbeyond in Belfast (Northern Ireland). This particular workshop, held at Inter/Le Lieu, centre en art actuel (Quebec City, Quebec, Canada), was attended by those who would be Le Tas Invisibles founding members.

The collective's first Performance Monthly meetings or Performance Monthlies (PMs), which since its inception advocates for the inclusion of all the participants in "accidental" and "fleeting" (from the French, "furtive") performances within the public spaces (or alternative spaces) on the basis of voluntary, free association and anonymity, took place from 2013 to 2014 in the City of Quebec. In 2014, a first "tas invisible" (invisible gathering) was held in Ottawa. Moreover, in 2014, a first geographically dispersed tas invisible took place simultaneously in two cities – Quebec City (Quebec) and Grande Prairie (Alberta). As such, the collective opts for multi-site, simultaneous manifestations despite differences of time and space. In 2014, Le Tas Invisible travelled to Northern Ireland in order to participate in a festival at Belfast presented by the Bbeyond collective, which is internationally acclaimed for its contribution to innovate performance art.

The collective's activities have also included projects such as an artist's residency at Flax International, during which they performed in Derry. In 2016, Le Tas Invisible was dormant for six months. Thereafter, the collective resumed its activities in full force. New branches of the collective have sprouted in many cities in the province of Quebec, such as in Montréal and Rimouski in 2016, and in 2017, in Trois-Rivières. In 2014, a "tas" in Ottawa/Gatineau become active, multiplying its members and manifestation from 2016 onwards. Occasionally, the collective performs by including international contributors from countries such as Germany and Spain, or members perform in other cities (for example in Bratislava, Madrid, Nice, Tel Aviv). They need no formal invitation to perform and manifest themselves through action. Therefore, those who act are indeed Le Tas.

On September 22, 2016, the various splinters groups of Le Tas Invisible acted in synchronicity with an international gathering of performance art called the Rencontre internationale d'art performance (RiAP), organized by Inter/Le Lieu. As a discrete manifestation presented outside of the official festival, the global event was called Equinox to Equinox: Same Difference. Initiated by the collective Bbeyond, to which Le Tas Invisible was invited to collaborate, the manifestation included more than 37 groups of performers performing simultaneously throughout the world. On September 22, 2017, for exceptional reasons, Le Tas Invisible decided to out its own invisibility for a day in support of the Day of Public Action for Freedom and Democracy. Initiated by the performance artist and cultural activist called Chumpon Apisuk (Thailand), following Equinox to Equinox, this day was an extension of the symposium program called Being in Public: Encounters – Outer Place and Inner Space, again organized by Bbeyond in Northern Ireland, where Le Tas Invisible contributed. During the autumn Equinox, the collective manifested itself throughout Canada through manifestation of art in action in public spaces in Ottawa (Ontario), Montreal (Quebec), Quebec City (Québec), Trois-Rivières (Québec), Rimouski (Quebec), Hermit Lake (Alberta), Edmonton (Alberta), Lethbridge (Alberta), and Victoria, (British Columbia) – simultaneously. A letter signed by Bbeyond and the 37 performance collectives scattered across the globe participating in the equinoctial event (including Le Tas Invisible) is circulating from country to country and will be provided to the Office of the United Nations High Commissioner for Human Rights principal religious representatives of the world in order to declare the autumn Equinox a Day for Freedom and Democracy in public.

== Characteristics of the Invisibles ==
- Anonymity of the Invisibles.
- Inclusivity of members on a voluntary basis (monthly or punctual).
- Collective and collaborative performances of an open session format in the public space (art based on its community).
- Aesthetic research and mandate for invisibility.
- Infiltration of public space into a collective gathering.
- Multi-site performances (groups in splinter groups are synchronized although geographically dispersed).

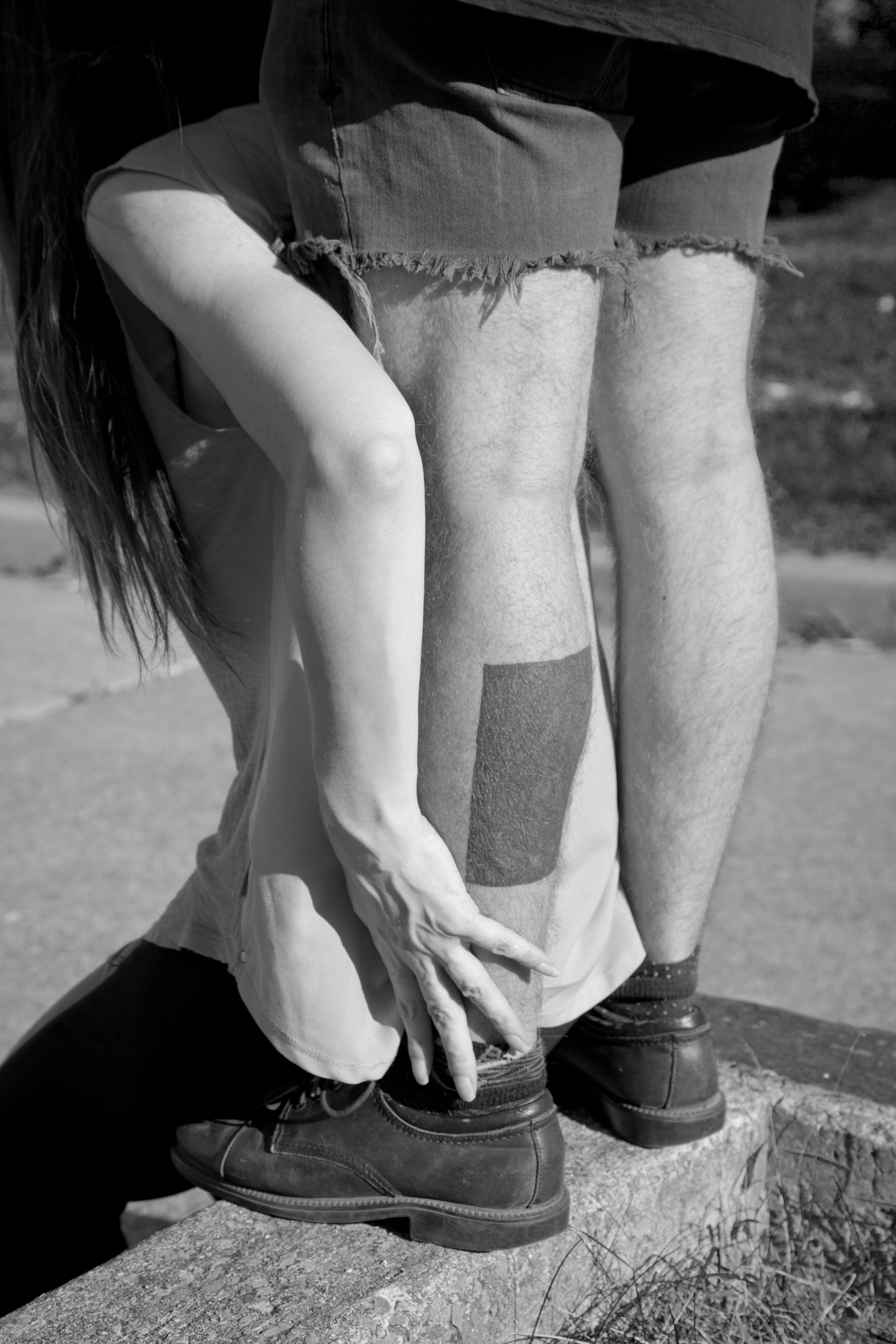

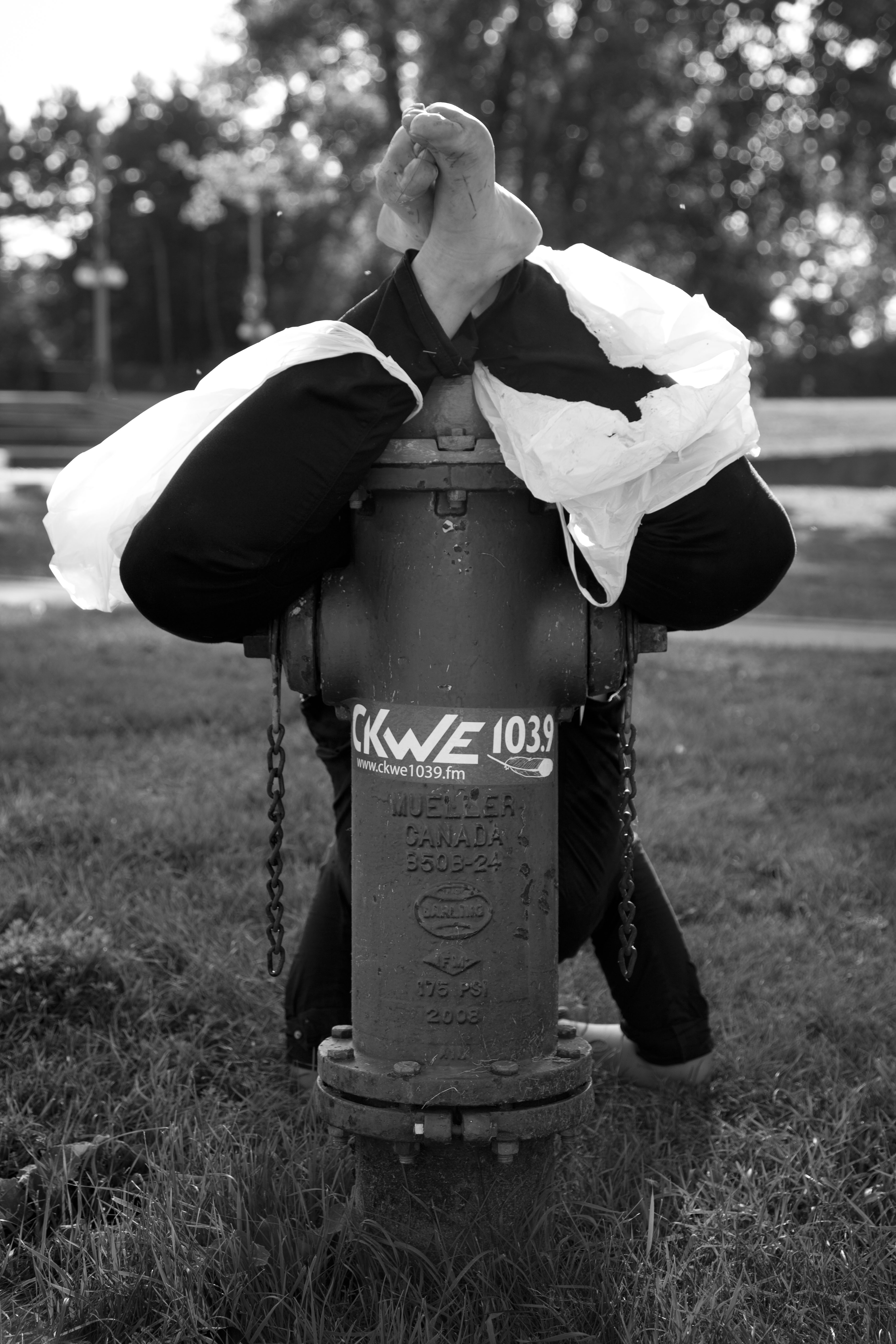

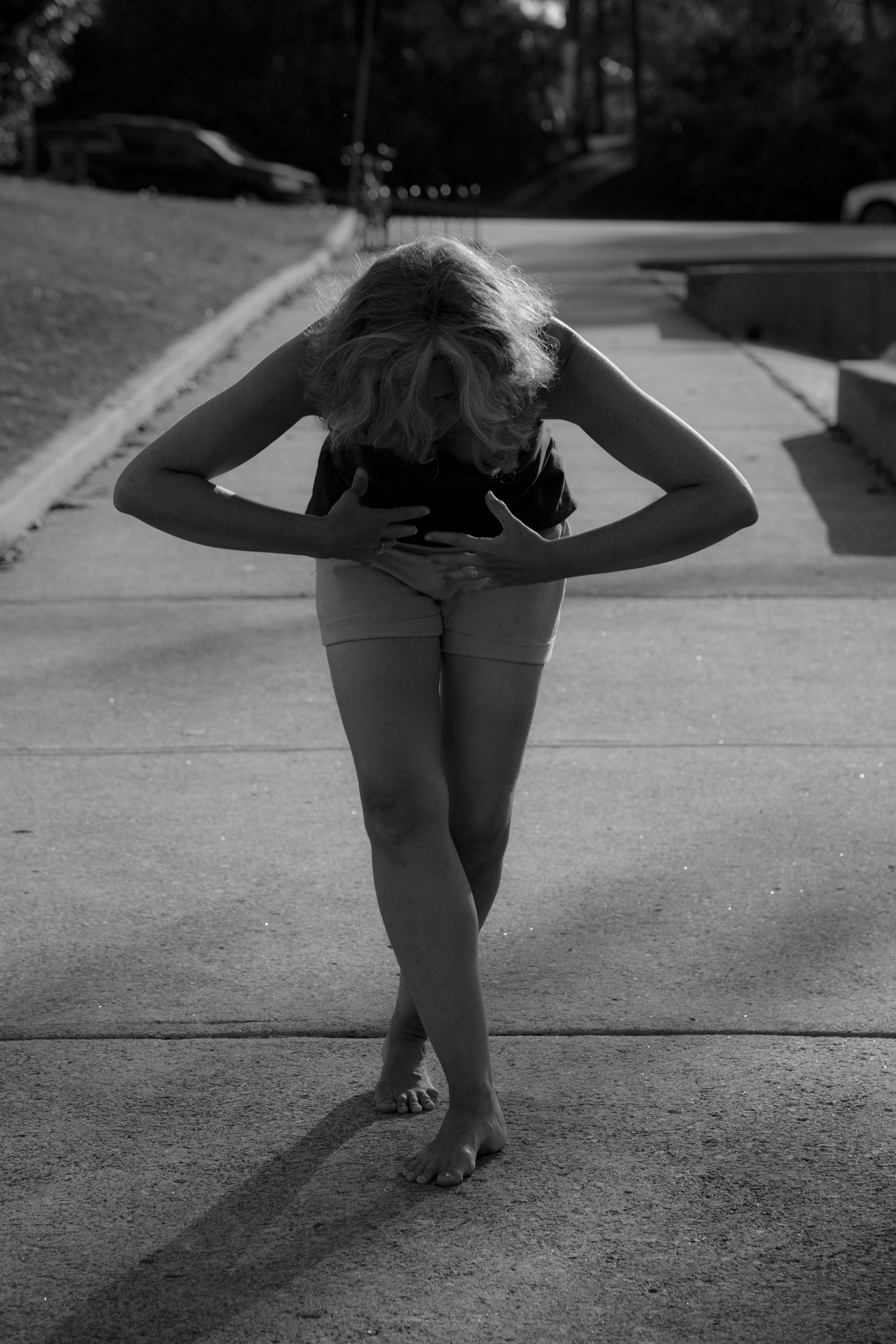
alt

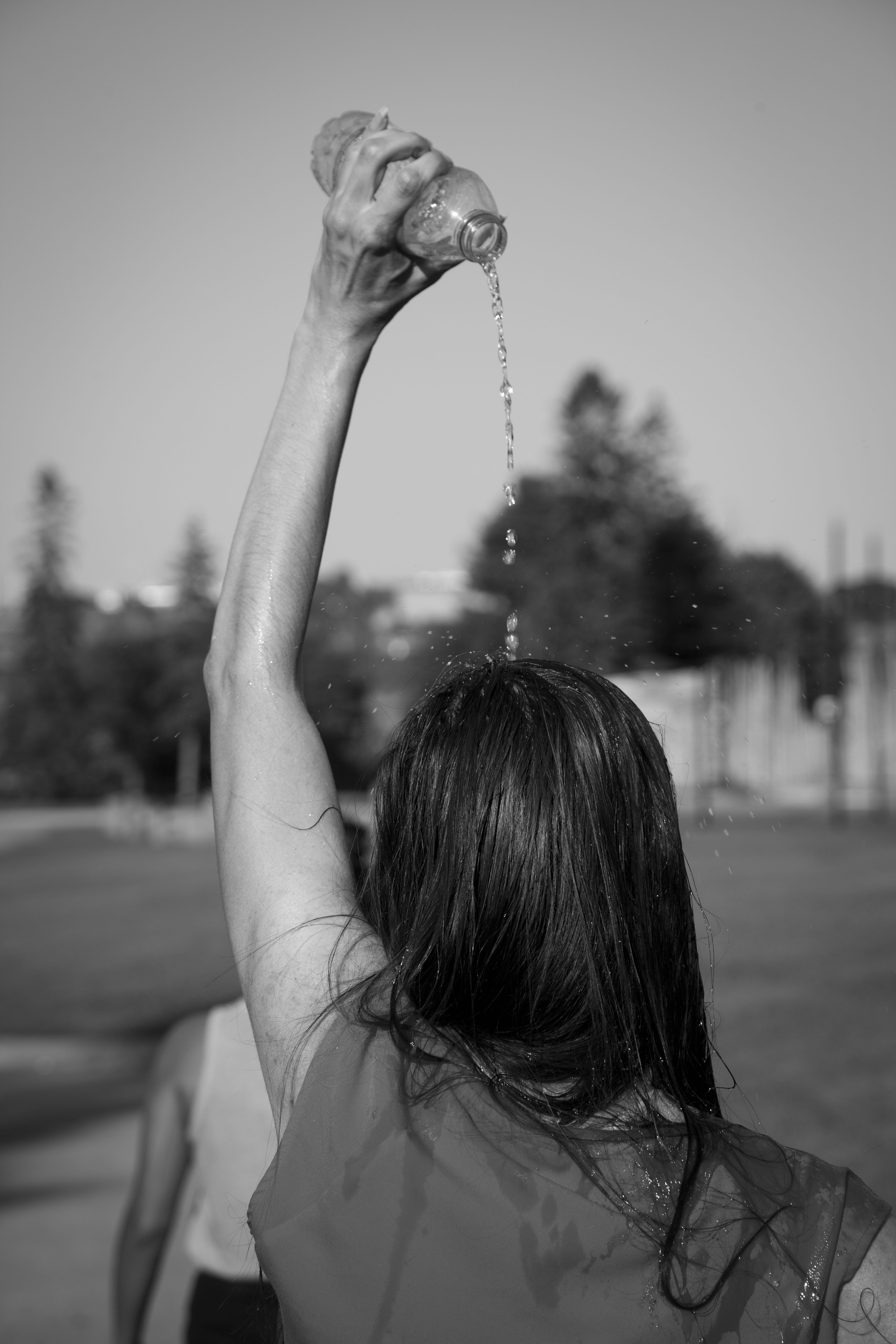
alt
