= Brian Feldman =

Brian Feldman may refer to:

- Brian Feldman (artist), American performance artist based in Washington, D.C.
- Brian Feldman (politician) (born 1961), American state legislator from Maryland
