= Natacha Voliakovsky =

Argentine activist and performance artist

- Born: 1988 (age 37–38); Buenos Aires, Argentina
- Education: University of Buenos Aires
- Known for: performance art
- Website: https://natachavoliakovsky.com/

Natacha Voliakovsky (Buenos Aires, 1988) is an Argentine queer performance artist and activist based in New York who develops part of her work in the field of bio-hardcore political performance, with the use of other media such as photography, video, and installation. She works by exposing and transforming her own body to the limit, with the aim of revealing through her high-impact performance, how those oppressive norms of the dominant culture operate. Through this proposal, she seeks to the question about the established moral and works on issues related to gender identity, the free sovereignty and autonomy of the body, the identity, the self-perception.

She also explores through interventions and disruptive actions in the public space with themes like migration, power dynamics, abortion, and gender equality, works in which she evidences her perspective of art as a socially transformative tool.

Voliakovsky is the creator of the first digital platform specialized in theoretical research, archive, and heritage, Argentina Performance Art - APA (2018). One of the platform's activities was a public interview Voliakovsky conducted with artist Marta Minujín. She established a specific training method in performance art in Argentina. She participated in group exhibitions and made performances in Argentina, Brazil, Colombia, United States, Greece, Guatemala, Finland, India, England, Italy, Uruguay, Czech Republic, Mexico, Turkey, Ukraine, among others.

In the field of bio-hacking, she has surgically intervened her body and made audiovisual records of it, focusing on the intervention over her own corporeality as a form of political activism.

== Education and scholarships ==
Her academic career began at the Faculty of Architecture, Design, and Urbanism of the University of Buenos Aires (UBA) where she obtained a degree in Graphic designer. She also completed two years of the bachelor's degree in Visual Arts at the National University of the Arts (UNA).

She participated in different programs and scholarships. The most important from Argentina have been awarded by Fondo Nacional de las Artes (National Endowment for the Arts), Fundación Cazadores, Sur Polar (Antártida). Among the most important international formations were an intensive performance workshop coordinated by the Italian-German artistic duo VestAndPage, in the context of the Venice International Performance Art Week in Venice (Italy, 2018).

She was also selected in EmergeNYC (New York, 2019), an artistic incubation program of the Hemispheric Institute, with which she developed her site-specific The Weight of the Invisible, which was exhibited at Abrons Arts Center and at NoOsphereArt as part of Greenpoint Open Studios. In the 2019 – 2020 season she integrated the professional workshop for artists at Creative Capital, a program for Spanish-speaking artists residing in NY. During these residencies he developed several of her performances, which she later presented in different places

She was part of the 2021 cohort of the INVERSE Program Art Symposium in partnership with The Momentary Museum and the Crystal Bridges Museum (Bentonville, Arkansas). In the context of this program emerged her work State Control in which she questions the biopolitical power of the state over women and the bodies of persons with uterus. This work was exhibited at the Argentine Consulate in New York.

== Artwork and professional career ==
=== Political bio-hacking performance and high impact ===
The artist constantly reflects on the limits of the standard of feminine beauty. In various presentations, Voliakovsky exposed her healing process after several surgical interventions by making textual and video records of each phase of recovery. Through these procedures of documenting her own body, she embodies the logic and devices of bodily and aesthetic standardization of modern society, to expose and reflect on them concerning time.

One of the most important performances with this treatment are:

- La pieza del escándalo (The piece of scandal, 2018). The artist ate the spiced remains of the tissues extracted from her scalp in a plate decorated with orchids, two days after undergoing an eyebrow lift surgery. The performance was carried out at the Casa Victoria Ocampo in the series of exhibitions of the Fondo Nacional de las Artes (National Endowment for the Arts). The artist reflects on Christian double standards and capitalist anthropophagy.
- Layers of Erasure (2019) Voliakovsky cosmetically intervened her legs in live for 45 minutes, highlighting their "imperfections", at AC Institute NYC. Conceptually, the performance works, in one act, with the disidentification of the biologicism around the identity, race and a phenotype.
- The weight of the invisible (2019) The performance with fluids and blood is used by the artist as a symbolic resource and impact tool, especially in those in which she works with the defense of the right to abortion. In this site-specific the artist problematized, through the manipulation of blood, the complications around clandestine abortions in Argentina and in the world, exposing the unsafe and oppressive conditions for those who wish to finish their pregnancies. The social-political context of the work was in accordance with the demonstrations in Georgia and Alabama for the legalization of abortion in both states. At that moment, this procedure wasn't legalized in Argentina, country where she was born. Subsequently, at the end of 2020, this right was legalized to be practiced in a free and safe protocol. With this work she participated in New York Latin America Art Triennial. Abya Yala 2022
- Daily Reflection (2019). For 30 minutes she chewed a newspaper that includes news with offensive content towards women, migrants and LGBTIQ people, and after this symbolic ingestion, she left the mass of paper on the floor. This action was performed in New York City as part of Itinerant, Performance Art Festival NYC, at The Immigrant Artist Biennial (TIAB), at MAC Mercado de Arte Córdoba, Argentina. In 2020 at The Miami New Media Festival, MNMF XV Edition.
- State Control (2021) She wrote "State Control" in blood on her belly and spread it along a white flag with red letters indicating "My body is not state property" to invite the reflection on the interference of states in the decision of our body.

=== Performances in public space and site-specific ===
Her performances aren't limited to spaces dedicated to art, but also to demonstrations and protest in support of egalitarian gender relations and freedom to make decisions about one's own body. Her research specializes in the role of public space and social behavior in it. Participated in the group show Change Makers: Ways of Protest, in collaboration with Swansea Museum, Swansea county council and Fusion, which reflected on art as a form of social protest. The exhibition consisted of various contemporary artists interacting with the collection of objects and elements that were used in protests and social movements that make up the collection of the Swansea Museum (United Kingdom).

- Žena ve Válce (Woman at war, 2017). She let down in the middle of Prague's Old Square, (Czech Republic), covered with a red flag and the text printed in black with the phrase "Žena ve Válce" ("Woman at war" in Czech). In this way, she took the war tradition in honor of the fallen soldiers but recovers it to make visible the dead women never glorified.
- It's an open question (2018), and "Nacimos con la pena de muerte" (2021) She made interventions in several multitudinous feminist demonstrations in Argentina. She usually works with flags in her artistic work, as a symbolic resignification and similar to the way that posters, handkerchiefs and green scarf are used as a form of protest in Latin America, especially in the feminist struggle.
- For a state out of our bodies (2022) She showed up at Foley Square, dressed in black with a flag full of blood with a message during the demonstrations against the violation of the right to abortion in the United States.

=== Latest performances ===
Her latest explorations included the work of identity from a more fluid place in relation to the body itself and addressing the rupture of traditional and naturalized gender conceptions. Based on this reflection, she also created an Instagram filter where digitality comes into play. She reflected on the non-moment of identity in which she ambiguously places herself when she undergoes facial surgery.

- Survival Praxis (2020) as part of Contagion Cabaret (2020) at Dixon Place with several artists. Curated by Ashley Brockington, it featured online activations about bodily bonds in virtuality in the wake of the pandemic. Also in the New York Artist Equity Association and was part of the group show Only If We Wish To: A NYAE Curatorial Residency Exhibition (2020). The video performance was also exhibited at the 6th Experimental Film Festival of Bogotá (Colombia), Fringe Festival 2020, Philadelphia (USA), 2nd International Forum of Performance Art and Drama (Greece), Goa Moving Image Festival (India).
- State of Alert,(2021) she was part of the Performance is alive fair at Satellite Art Show 2021 Miami, which promoted live-action by artists who suffered the effects of the pandemic, curated by Quinn Dukes and Brian Andrew Whiteley. This performance addresses the state of vulnerability of migrants.
- Removed (2021), in collaboration with Inti Pujol in the framework of an online event organized by Grace Exhibition Space, a Brooklyn gallery that invited the artist to carry out the exhibition. In the course of the same year, she made the exhibition Taking my body is taking my life curated by Patricia Rizzo where she presented a series of photo-performances with interventions in adhesive tape, surgical bandages and a black flag expressing "Ignore me if it is too violent. I don't intend to impose anything". The exhibition was at the ESAA Art Gallery, the founding institution of FARO, Association of Galleries of Cordoba (Argentina) (2021).

== Argentine Performance Art Platform – APA ==
The artist collaboratively created the first Argentinian digital platform specialized in performance theory, research, archive, and heritage, called Argentina Performance Art – APA in 2018. The project was declared of interest by the Legislature of the Government of the City of Buenos Aires through the Office of Cultural Patronage for its contribution to the contemporary art community.

This project arose from the need for this contemporary artistic discipline to be recognized and developed in Argentina. Her motivation was permeated by several factors: on the one hand the scarce economic contribution that this branch of art receives in the country about its apparently ephemeral and immaterial nature, on the other hand, the little knowledge about its methods even within the same field of art. Ultimately, the artist detected the absence of specialized training spaces that still associate performance as an art immersed only within the performing arts.

One of its tasks is the documentation of performances in which there was no material record, but there was an oral transmission of the experience, recovered through the archiving of living sources such as artists, historians, critics, and journalists. The project seeks to preserve the historical and symbolic memory of this particular language by strengthening the work of recording and conservation.

It was launched to the public in 2020, after two years of previous work. The platform aims to provide free and open access to knowledge about performance, through historical archives, journalistic articles, research, and conferences and interviews with various references.

After the first event during the pandemic and being invited by Grace Exhibition Space in New York, a conference was held in 2022 on the current state of performance art, attended by the most prominent figures of Argentine performance art, such as Marta Minujin, among others with the support of the Centro Cultural Recoleta, an outstanding cultural space in the city.

== Other performances and exhibitions ==
- Transitional Identity, New York, 2020. Exhibited at Denmark, as part of the Cyber Bodies exhibition, Performance Køkkene.
- Hacer de la sangre algo público, Buenos Aires, 2020. Exhibited at Legislatura de la Ciudad Autónoma de Buenos Aires, Museo Artes Visuales de Lobos, Argentina. 2020.
- State of Alert, Croatia, 2019. Performed at Performance Is Alive-Satellite Art Show, New York. 2019
- Algo de mi vuelve a mí, Buenos Aires, 2019. Exhibited at Cuerpos Migrantes, IIII Festival Cuirpoetikas. Guatemala, Centro América, 2019
- Todas somos putas, Buenos Aires, 2019. Exhibited in Grace Exhibition Space, New York. Performance Is Alive-Satellite Art Show, Austin. 2019
- Supervivencia, Rosario, 2018
- Expulsión violenta, Buenos Aires, 2017
- Ejercicio para la emergencia, Rosario, 2017
- Occupy, Buenos Aires, 2016. Screened at Carbonarium International Performance Art Festival. Kyiv, Ukraine, 2019 Frenesí – Espacio Pan de Azúcar. Necochea, Argentina, 2019 Videokanava's FEM4 Contemporary Art Exhibition. Finland, 2019
- Pecho Argentino, Buenos Aires, Argentina, 2014-Italy, 2018
