= Artincidence =

Non profit art company

Artincidence is a nonprofit performance art company founded by Annabel Guérédrat based in Trois-Îlets, Martinique. Guérédrat is its principal performer and choreographer. Started as a dance company in 2003, it moved into performance work in 2010. Its current members include visual and performance artist Henri Tauliaut, choreographer, performer and researcher Ana Monteiro, drummer and sound designer Franck Martin, choreographer Javier Contreras Villaseñor, and Martinican artist Gwladys Gambie.

Projects include Guérédrat and Tauliaut's performance works and international residencies, FIAP, a Martinique-based performance art fair, and a bimonthly workshop in body art and land art at the Savanes des Petrifications in the island's south.

Artincidence has, among other things, overseen Guérédrat and Tauliaut's interdisciplinary residencies in Santiago, Chile, Paris (including at Centre National de la Danse and Cent Quatre), and Lisbon (at the Gaivotas Cultural Center and Forum Dança), all in 2016.
