= Black Market International =

Black Market International (BMI) is a performance artist collective with international members, each with an established and independent practice as a solo performer. Since 1985 the group has presented durational collective performances worldwide.

The movement was founded under the name Market project in 1985 in Poznan (Poland) with founders Boris Nieslony, Zygmunt Piotrowski, Tomas Ruller and Jürgen Fritz. In 1986 for the first European tour the name Black Market was taken. In 1990/91 the group appeared as Black Market International, with personal changes .

There have been a variety of different versions of what BMI is about, as the group always avoided the definition of an organised group. The title Black Market does not designate a group, but rather an idea of working. The aim is to promote - like in a black market - open and free exchange of ideas, and to achieve an Art of Encounter, or mixed englisch-german “Art of Begegnung”.

== Members ==
Until 2014, the group had twelve regular members:

- Jürgen Fritz, Germany
- Norbert Klassen, Switzerland (1941–2011)
- Miriam Laplante, Canada/Italy
- Alastair MacLennan, UK
- Helge Meyer, Germany
- Boris Nieslony, Germany
- Jacques van Poppel, Netherlands
- Elvira Santamaria, Mexico
- Marco Teubner, Germany
- Julie Andree T., Canada
- Roi Vaara, Finland
- Lee Wen, Singapore (1957–2019)

Past Black Market International members were:

- Zygmunt Piotrowski, Poland
- Tomas Ruller, Czech Republic
- Nigel Rolfe, Ireland
- Zbigniew Warpechowski, Poland.

Several international guest artists have been invited to collaborate in BMI performances throughout the years.

== See also ==
- Performance art
- Fluxus
- Experimental theatre
- Living theatre
- Intermedia
- Norbert Klassen
- Alastair MacLennan
- Lee Wen
- List of performance artists
