= VestAndPage =

European artist duo

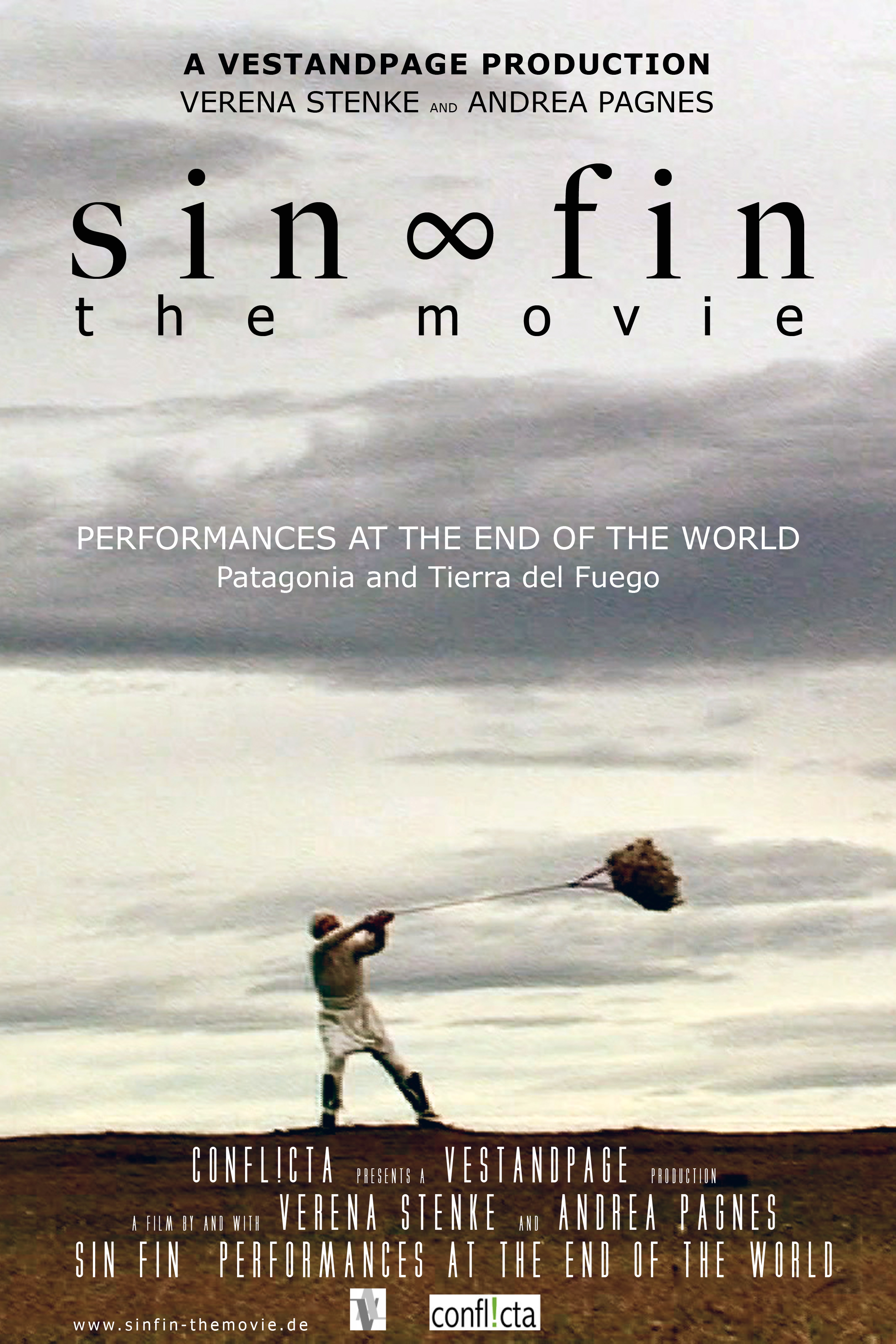
Movie poster of sin∞fin – Performances at the End of the World, A VestAndPage production, Chile/Italy 2010

VestAndPage is an artist duo founded in 2006 by Verena Stenke (Germany) and Andrea Pagnes (Italy), working in contemporary performance art, visual art, and film. Their work is positioned within the social, political and environmental context of spherology, fragility, memory activation and communication, with a strong influence of the artists’ backgrounds in philosophy and theatre. They present meditative and ritualistic performances that challenge impermanence, transformation and self-awareness. Over the past years they have presented their work extensively in Europe, Asia, North America, South America and Australia. They work in extensive collaborations in what they call "collective performance operas", and create "temporary artistic communities". An untitled controversial work presented in Singapore in 2011, involves the couple drinking Pagnes' blood. The artist stated in an interview that blood is "the purest part of me", and that "I am using drops of my soul to say something."

== Life and education ==
Verena Stenke (born 1981, Bad Friedrichshall, Germany) is trained in theatre, martial arts, contemporary dance, and holds qualifications as special effects make-up artist and mask maker. She studied Oriental and Social Theatre. She lived in Berlin, and moved to Florence in 2006.

Andrea Pagnes (born 1962, Venice) holds degrees in Modern Literature and Philosophy, certificates of high studies in Museology, Art critic, and Creative writing, and obtained the diploma of Social Theatre actor and operator. He has been working as independent curator, writer, painter, and glass sculptor. He founded cultural magazines, and has been artistic director of a Murano glass factory. He has translated among others Jurassic Park into Italian, and lived in Venice and Florence.

Verena Stenke and Andrea Pagnes are married, and currently living in Baden-Württemberg, Germany and Venice.

== Major works and projects ==
=== Film ===
==== sin∞fin The Movie ====
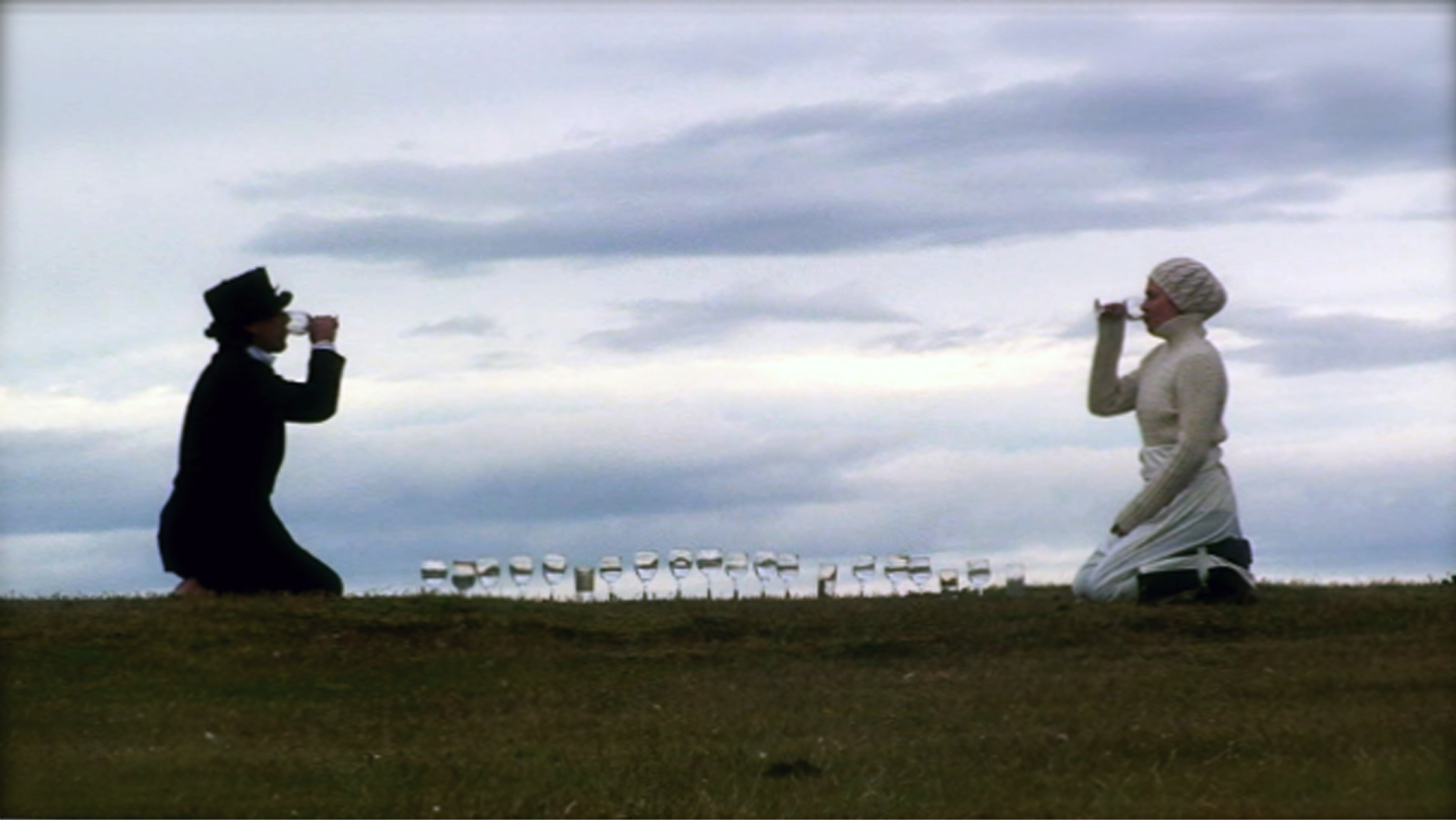
Verena Stenke and Andrea Pagnes in "sin∞fin – Performances at the End of the World", 2010

Between 2010 and 2012, VestAndPage produced the experimental film trilogy sin∞fin The Movie in Antarctica, India, Kashmir, Patagonia and Tierra del Fuego, combining performance art with filmmaking. Teetering between the real and the visionary, the films feature the two protagonists undertaking surreal and ephemeral acts. Amplified by the unfamiliar environments, the performances reflect on universal human experiences such as altruism, partnership and the transient nature of existence. The first episode "Performances at the End of the World", thematically focuses on the intimate, inner domain of the individual and the couple. The second episode "Performances at the Holy Centre" highlights the topic of society and religion. The concluding episode "Performances at the Core of the Looking-Glass", engages with narratives on nature and the universe. The first episode has been produced at artist-in-residence at CONFL!CTA Contemporary Art and Science Research, Punta Arenas and Tierra del Fuego in December 2010. The second episode has been realized during the artist-in-residence at The Sarai Programme at CSDS, New Delhi, in March/April 2011. The third episode has been produced as part of the cultural program of the National Antarctic Direction, Argentina, on the Antarctic stations Carlini and Esperanza Base in January and February 2012.

==== Plantain ====
In 2015, VestAndPage produced the performance-based feature film Plantain [de: Spitzwegerich] in Germany, Poland and Kaliningrad Oblast, Russia. Filmed on location during the artist duo's month-long performance walk, the project takes a private family story and the historical event of post-WWII displacements as starting points. The artists walked, performed and filmed along the route of war escape of Stenke's ancestors upon the evacuation of East Prussia in winter 1945, in the civil exodus along the Baltic Sea to Northern Germany. Referenced through the performance-walk in real time, the film connects in a layering of histories, people, and personal memories, the intangible and ineffable of a past which has been lived by another generation with a present feeling of guilt.

=== Long durational performances ===
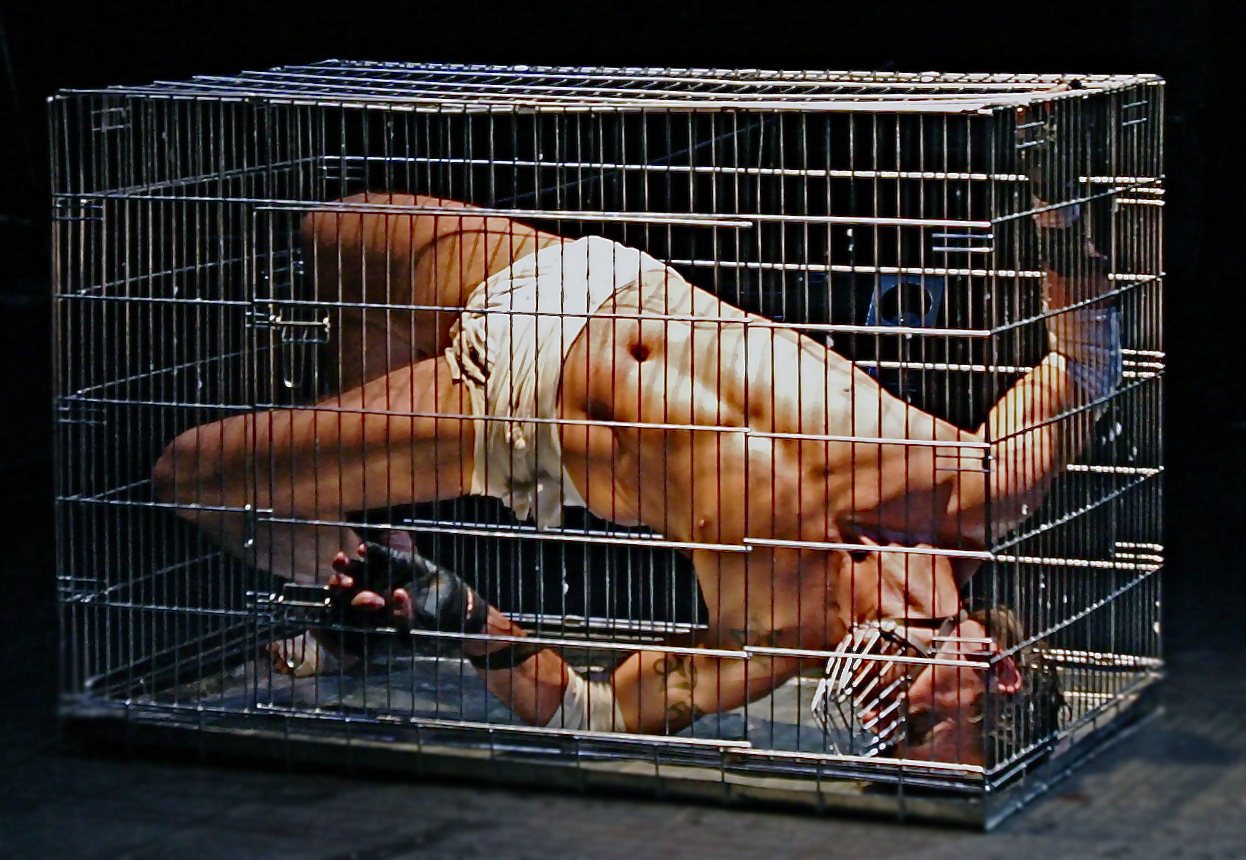
Andrea Pagnes in the dog crate. Photograph by Simone Donati.

==== Plantain ====
From May 8, 2015 on – marking the end of WWII in Europe on its 70th anniversary – VestAndPage walked by foot in a month-long performance the path of war exodus that Stenke's family went 70 years before from East Prussia to Northern Germany, this time in the opposite direction: 1110 kilometres from Hemmingstedt, Germany, to Chernyakhovsk (former Insterburg) in the Russian Kaliningrad Oblast. Along the way, the artist realised and filmed site-responsive performances, and collected film and text material on location of true events such as the Castle Insterburg, the Vistula Lagoon, or the former Stutthof concentration camp and seaplane base Kamp (Fort Rogowo). The long durational performance project resulted in a feature-length film.

==== Fear vs Love vs Fear ====
The 24-hour performance Fear vs Love vs Fear was presented as part of the curatorial project Proyecto Liquido by Alumnos47 Foundation, June 2012. The artists inhabited an empty house in San Miguel Chapultepec, Mexico City and performed inside for 24 hours, with the public free to enter and exit at any time. The body-based actions explored origins and effects of love and fear, being individual or collective, and works on memory associations. In preparation to the live performance, Stenke and Pagnes had previously worked with a group of street girls in Mexico City to understand their fears, desires, and dreams. The text, image and video material produced by the girls during this workshop became part of the performance installation in the house.

==== Without Tuition or Restraint ====
Without Tuition or Restraint is a long durational performance of five days and four nights. It took place at The Exchange and Newlyn Gallery in Penzance, as part of the exhibition Performance Transition in November 2011. The couple has been closed inside and didn't exit the gallery for five days and four nights consecutively. During this period Andrea Pagnes lived inside a dog crate, while Verena Stenke inside the gallery space executed one repetitive action each day. The performance questions concepts of freedom, and limits between private and social spheres.

==== Speak That I Can See You ====
Speak That I Can See You is the first performance of Stenke's and Pagnes' debut as VestAndPage. The interactive piece won the ArtKontakt Prize (Tirana) in 2007. Since then the performance has been presented on several occasions, among others at the Kosovo Art Gallery, Pristina (2007); Fondaco dell’Arte, Venice (2009); XIV Biennial of Young Artists from Europe and the Mediterranean, Skopje (2009); Fábrica de Braço de Prata, Lisbon (2010); PingPong Artspace, Taipei (2012); London Art Fair, London (2014). In the installation set of medical surgery videos and a soundtrack of voices speaking about fear in three languages, Stenke invites audience members to participate in a ritual. Pagnes' back is offered as a living canvas for the audience to express their thoughts by writing with effect powder, water, and feathers or nails on his skin.

=== Performance cycles ===
==== HOME Cycle ====
HOME is a live performance cycle of collective performance operas started by VestAndPage in 2017. Stations of the performance are along the border of the European Union in countries that all have to find a way to deal with the wave of immigration, including Reggello, Italy; Thessaloniki, Greece; KPGT, Belgrade, Serbia; Palazzo Mora, Venice, Italy; National Gallery of Arts, Sopot, Poland; Triennale Ostend, Belgium; Günther Domenig Steinhaus, Austria. The artists inquire into the concepts of home, Heimat, community and sites of belonging. The single chapters are developed together with other artists and presented as final collective performance operas.

==== AEGIS Cycle ====
AEGIS is a live performance cycle in six parts, developed and presented with the collaboration of other artists in the years 2016 and 2017 in Santiago de Chile; Alt, Istanbul; Grace Exhibition Space, New York City; UKK, Uppsala; Piotrków Trybunalski and at the State Museum of Contemporary Art, Thessaloniki. The work questions artistically the protective qualities of living matter, defence functions, shielding systems, and aspects of security, questioning what are valuable and timeless protections and safeties. In each chapter, the bodily symbolic acts of the artists are accompanied by the reading of the Universal Declaration of Human Rights in the language of the place. Recordings of the Declaration produced for the performance are available for free public domain audio download in English, German, Italian, Spanish, Russian, Turkish, Swedish, Polish and Greek language from the artists' website.

==== DYAD Cycle ====
DYAD is a live performance cycle in nine parts, developed and presented in 2014/2015 at hub14, Toronto; Arti et Amicitiae, Amsterdam; Teatar &TD, Zagreb; Museum der bildenden Künste, Leipzig; Hermann Brehmer Sanatorium, Sokołowsko; Arnolfini, Bristol; Peacock Visual Arts, Aberdeen; and closed in a 15-hour durational performance in Moscow. The work looks into the dangers of dichotomy, attachments to dualism, and the paradox of Ego. Through a series of poetic bodily images, the artists question how polarities are being employed as tools of ideology, propaganda or collective manipulation. Each episode starts with a quote from Genesis 7.2 and a physical fight between the artists dressed as a mouse and a rabbit.

==== Thou Twin of Slumber Cycle ====
Thou Twin of Slumber is a performance cycle in eight parts. It has been produced and presented through the year 2013 at Cyclorama – Boston Centre for the Arts, Boston; Kasteliotissa, Nicosia; Grace Exhibition Space, New York City; Defibrillator Gallery, Chicago; VIVO Media Arts Centre, Vancouver; Museo Universitario del Chopo, Mexico City; and Taidehalli, Helsinki. The work looks into death, sleep and slumber through liminal spaces, and is theoretically inspired by two figures of Greek mythology, the twin brothers Thanatos and Hypnos. In the performances of this cycle, Pagnes repeatedly works on broken glass and mirror pieces, while Stenke decontextualizes movement.

==== Panta Rhei Cycle ====
Panta Rhei is a performance cycle in six parts, presented 2011–2012 on tour in Asia at Taipei Artist Village, Taipei; Seoul Art Space, Seoul; CCCD Centre for Community Culture Development, Hong Kong; Goodman Arts Centre, Singapore; Chiang Mai University, Chiang Mai. It is a project inquiring impermanent states of transformation in systems and history, and the constant change and temporary nature of thoughts, body and relations. The artists follow a process-led and responsive practice in these performances that do not follow any dramaturgy but are mainly subdue to improvisation.

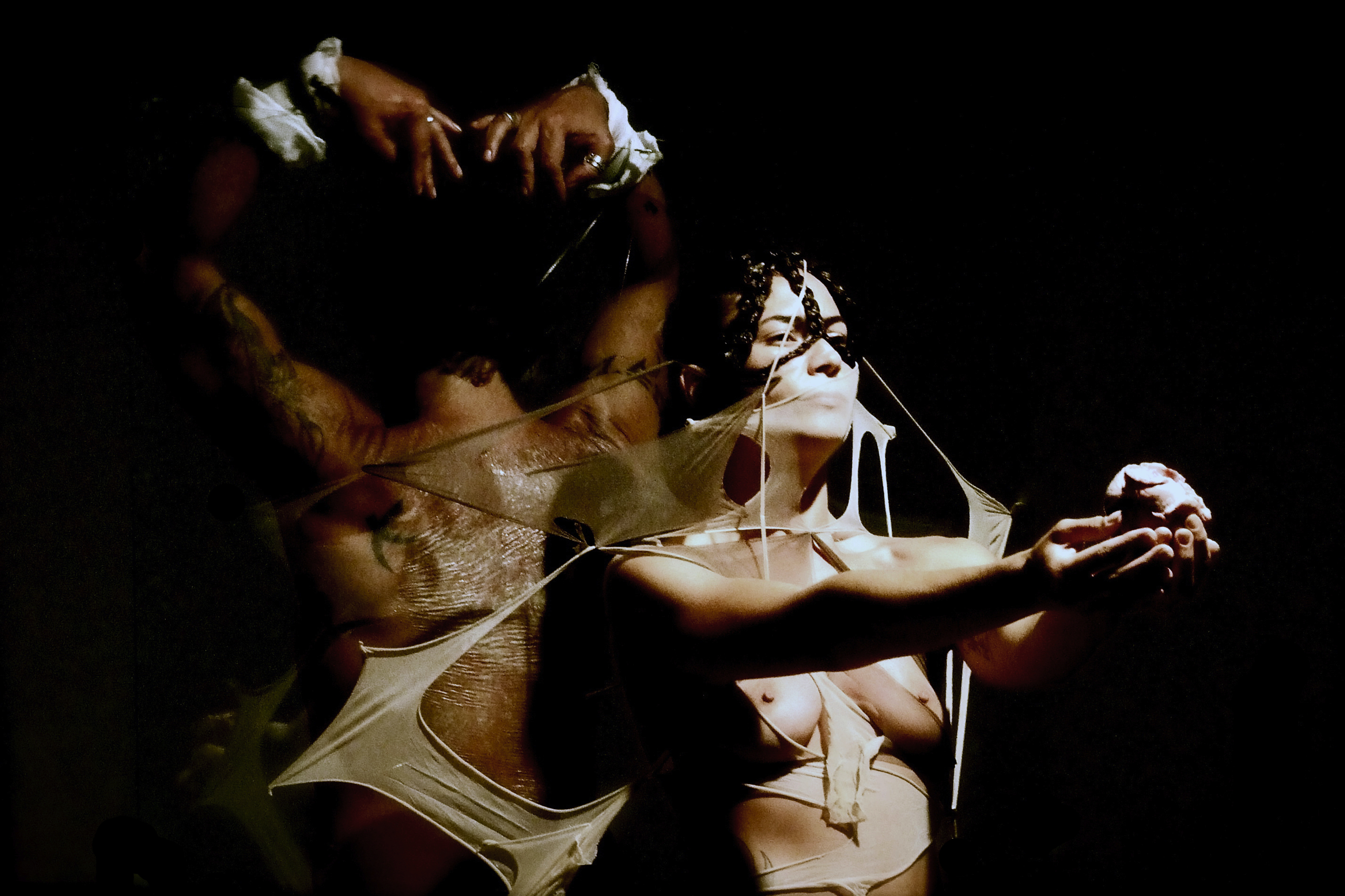
Balada Corporal, Homero Massena Gallery, Vitoria, Brazil, 2010. Photograph by Sergio Prucoli.

==== Balada Corporal Cycle ====
Balada Corporal is a performance cycle in five parts, presented in the year 2010 on a tour in South America. Venues included the Universidad Nacional Experimental de las Artes, Caracas; University of Chile, Santiago de Chile; Museo de Arte Contemporáneo Valdivia; CCEBA Centro Cultural de España, Buenos Aires; Homero Massena Gallery, Vitória. The cycle speaks about the difficulties of real encounters between humans, and the possibilities of transformation through concrete communication. It is composed of four live performances, and includes a fifth chapter that continues to remain conceptual as it consists of transplanting pieces of tattooed skin between the couple.

=== Curatorial projects ===
==== Venice International Performance Art Week ====
VestAndPage are the curatorial force behind the Venice International Performance Art Week. The Art Week started with the curated live art exhibition project titled Trilogy of the Bodyin December 2012 at Palazzo Bembo, Venice, featuring under the focus Hybrid Body – Poetic Body among others works by Yoko Ono, Valie Export, Hermann Nitsch, Ilija Šoškić, Jan Fabre, Lee Wen, Boris Nieslony, Jill Orr and a number of international emerging and established artists such as Nelda Ramos, Manuel Vason, Jason Lim, Gonzalo Rabanal, Prem Sarjo, Joseph Ravens, Helena Goldwater. Since 2014, the project continued at Palazzo Mora in Venice, and presented under the focus Ritual Body – Political Body live and in exhibition performance works by Joseph Beuys, Allen Ginsberg, Vito Acconci, Tehching Hsieh, Chris Burden, Terry Fox (artist), Zhang Huan, Guillermo Gómez-Peña, Alastair MacLennan, Carolee Schneemann, Ulay, Tania Bruguera, Regina José Galindo, Adina Bar-On, and many others. In 2016, the Trilogy of the Body concluded with Fragile Body – Material Body, with works live and in exhibition among others by Marcel·lí Antúnez Roca, Franko B, ORLAN, Stelarc, Marina Abramović, John Baldessari, John Cage, Sophie Calle, Mona Hatoum, Paul McCarthy, Ana Mendieta, Charlotte Moorman & Nam June Paik, Otto Mühl & Hermann Nitsch, Bruce Nauman, Yoko Ono, Mike Parr, Bill Viola, Andy Warhol & Jørgen Leth, Lawrence Weiner, and many more. . . Since 2017, the project has changed its format and presents the international educational program with residential character Co-Creation Live Factory, founded on the principles of artistic collaboration, cooperation and temporary artistic community.

==== Making Up – Tearing Down ====
The performance section curated by VestAndPage had been presented in various venues in Prague in October 2011. The curatorial line concentrated on radical transparency and eco-intelligence in contemporary performance art, presenting performances by seven female artists.

==== FRAGILE global performance chain journey ====
In 2010, VestAndPage began a project called FRAGILE global performance chain journey, a global art initiative with over 750 artists from 63 countries working together travel one fragile object one time around the globe. The visionary project demands patience and collaboration, reflecting on fragile states, social responsibility, and connection between people.

== Bibliography ==
=== Works by Andrea Pagnes and VestAndPage ===
Theoretical essays and prose works in English language:

- III VENICE INTERNATIONAL PERFORMANCE ART WEEK 2016 Fragile Body – Material Body. Exhibition catalogue. Venice: VestAndPage press, 2017. Hardcover, pp. 272.
- Onufri XXI – SiO2 – The Reason of Fragility, Contemporary Artists Facing Glass. Exhibition catalogue. Tirana: Albanian National Gallery of Arts and VestAndPage press, 2017, Hardcover, pp. 192. ISBN 978-9928-4355-1-4
- II VENICE INTERNATIONAL PERFORMANCE ART WEEK 2014 Ritual Body – Political Body. Exhibition catalogue. Venice: VestAndPage press, 2016. Hardcover, pp. 208.
- Studio Research. ""Two Bodies in Space. Durational Performance: The Quest for Authenticity in the VestAndPage Experience"" (2015)
- Studio Research. ""Two Bodies in Space. Durational Performance: The Quest for Authenticity in the VestAndPage Experience"" (2015)
- Routledge Performance Research. "Antarctic Dream – Ice as Architecture of the Human Spirit by Andrea Pagnes & Verena Stenke" (2014)
- I VENICE INTERNATIONAL PERFORMANCE ART WEEK 2012 Hybrid Body – Poetic Body. Exhibition catalogue. Venice: VestAndPage press, 2014. Hardcover, pp. 128.
- Art & Education. "Reconfiguring Think Tanks as discursive and social model in contemporary art: Suggestions for a theoretical analysis" (2012)
- Research Catalogue. "Considering the Nature of the Poetic Image and its Performativity" (2012)
- Hesa Inprint, Issue 16: Ph/Fobia. "IT" (2012)
- Hesa Inprint, Issue 14: Addiction. "Without Restraint" (2012)
- Tina B. Festival, Catalogue Text. Prague: Vernon Gallery, 2011. ISBN 978-80-904461-4-4
- Re-tooling Residencies. "Reconfiguring Think Tanks as discursive, social model in Contemporary Art". (2011)
- Art & Education. "Body Issues in Performance Art: Between Theory and Praxis" (2011)
- 972 Art – Art and Culture Arena. "Defiling by Art: Contamination" (2010)
- 972 Art – Art and Culture Arena. "The Meaning of Art Truth" (2010)
- The Fall of Faust – Considerations on Contemporary Art and Art Action. Florence: VestAndPage press, July 2010. Hardcover, pp. 208. ISBN 978-88-905161-0-8.
- 972 Art – Art and Culture Arena. "The Continuity of Becoming" (2010)
- 972 Art – Art and Culture Arena. "On the Ethical and Social Role of Art" (2010)
- MOT Masters of Today. "Letter to an Artist" (2007)

=== Critical and academic studies ===
- Jan Fabre, Joanna De Vos, et al. The Raft – Art is (Not) Lonely. Exhibition catalogue. Oostende: Lannoo, 2018. ISBN 978-94-014-48611
- KONTEKSTY – Konteksty w "Kontekstach" Issue Nr.4 (319). Warsaw: Art Institute of the Polish Academy of Sciences, 2017. ISSN 1230-6142
- Valentin Torrens, How We Teach Performance Art: University Courses and Workshop Syllabus, Outskirts Press, 2014. ISBN 978-1478731948
- Fundación Alumnos47, Proyecto Liquido: Miedo. Mexico City/Madrid: Turner Libros, 2013. ISBN 978-84-15832-65-2
- Yelena Guzman and Matvei Yankelevich, Emergency INDEX Volume 2. New York: Ugly Duckling Presse, 2013. pp. 490–491. ISBN 978-1-937027-12-4
- Johnny Amore, Performers. Pori: Pori Art Museum Publications, 2013. p. 61. ISBN 978-952-5648-40-9
- Karlyn De Jongh and Sarah Gold, Personal Structures Time – Space – Existence, Number Two. pp. 288–291. Venice: Global Art Affairs Publishing, 2013. ISBN 978-9490784133
- Peta Tait. "Performance Couplings". Performance Research: A Journal of the Performing Arts, Vol. 18, Issue2, 2013. Special Issue: On Value. pp. 139–140. ISSN 1352-8165 (Print), ISSN 1469-9990 (Online)
- Yelena Guzman and Matvei Yankelevich, Emergency INDEX Volume 1. New York: Ugly Duckling Presse, 2011. pp. 216–217. ISBN 978-1-937027-07-0
- Saverio Simi De Burgis and Dana Altman, "Andrea Pagnes and Verena Stenke". FLASH ART International, Vol. XLII, n° 266, May–June 2009. pp. 62–63. ISSN 0394-1493
- Carlos Leal, "Past Is Not Alone". emagazine Art beyond aesthetics. Issue n° 3, August 2009. pp. 119–120.
- BJCEM XIV. Biennial of Young Artists from Europe and the Mediterranean, SKOPJE 7 gates Biennial 2009. Milan: Mondadori Electa, 2009. ISBN 978-88-370-7167-7
- Macy Art Gallery, Visions in New York City. Exhibition catalogue. New York: Teachers College Columbia University, 2009
- Dana Altman, Art and Multiplicity – Essays on Contemporary Art. New York: Amadeo Press, 2008; (1st ed.); Timișoara: Bastion, 2008. ISBN 978-973-1980-30-0
- Suzana Varvarica Kuka, Conformism Space – Muliqi Prize '07. Pristine: The Kosovo Art Gallery, 2007.
- Christopher, Marquis, Who’s Who in American Art 2007–2008. New York: Marquis Who's Who, 2006. ISBN 0837-9630-60
- Istituto Italiano di Cultura, P.S.I. Italian Bureau selections 1998–2000. New York: Castelvecchi, 2000. ISBN 88-8210-194-0
- "Une exploration attentive de la poésie de la matière". Flux News, Liége. October 1999
- The Architects’ Journal, Volume 2008. London: Architectural Press, 1998
- La Biennale di Venezia. XLVII Esposizione Internazionale D'Arte. Venice: La Biennale di Venezia, 1997. ISBN 8843561529.
- G. K. Hall, Library Catalog of the Metropolitan Museum of Art, Supplement, Volume 3. New York: Metropolitan Museum of Art, 1987

== See also ==
- Performance art
- Avant-garde
- Experimental theatre
- Experimental film
- Surrealist cinema
- Body art
- Conceptual art
- Intermedia
- List of performance artists
