= Victor Dada =

Victor Dada was a popular performance art, poetry, and music group active in the Dallas, North Texas area between 1970 and 2000. They were well known in Dallas and instrumental in the revival of the Deep Ellum, Dallas, Texas arts scene of the 1980s where they opened Club Dada as a performance venue.

The group was founded in the 70s by Joe Stanco and Gary Deen, who began experimentation with performance pieces by banging pots and pans in their living room while they recited poetry. Farley Scott was also a member who joined the group later. The group's original name, "Victor Dada and the Ten O'clock Kaon," which came from the street co-founder Joe Stanco lived on in Dallas and the influence of the Dada art movement on the overall irreverent tone of their work.

Some of Victor Dada's popular works included the titles His & Herpes, Ranch Style Beans from Outer Space, Monotony, (Take Me Up Your) Love Canal and No Jacuzzi, among many other more serious Dada and nonsense works.

Joe Stanco, one of the founding members of the group, died of melanoma on June 5, 2002, bringing an end to Victor Dada's reign as one of Dallas' top performance poetry groups. Some of Stanco's poetry may be found on his page on DallasArtsRevue.com.
