= Norbert Klassen =

German actor and stage director

Norbert Klassen (30 May 1941 – 1 December 2011) was an actor, stage director, influential performance artist, educator and organizer of performance art festivals. He has lived and worked in Bern, and contributed significantly to making the city important for the contemporary performance art scene.

== Biography ==
Klassen was born 30 May 1941 in Duisburg, Germany. He trained acting at the Westphalian School of Acting in Bochum. His first engagement in the years 1963/64 was as a theatre actor at the Theater Aachen. He had since been active as an actor and stage director, among others at Studio am Montag, Bern; Bern Theatre; Komödie Düsseldorf; Kammerspiele Düsseldorf. He maintained links to the theatre world throughout his career, but his work received more acceptance within the performance art circuit, and Klassen identified himself primarily as a performance artist. He was inspired by Fluxus and Living Theatre. In his first performance, My Red Brother, Klassen sat at a table holding a cigarette and watching the smoke rise, an action that he repeated in his performances through the years.

Klassen had a black star tattooed on this bald head. The tattoo was result of a performance in homage to John Cage and Marcel Duchamp. This performance consisted in the action of the artist having his head tattooed inside a train station in 2008.

Klassen's work had been influenced by a multitude of co-operations with international artists from the backgrounds of acting, music, visual art and intermedia. He participated in numerous events by the international performance art network around the world.

Together with Gerhard Johann Lischka, Peter J. Betts, Rudolf Bober and others, Klassen founded the independent theatre collective Studio am Montag for experimental theatre in Bern in 1970, and run it in the position of director from 1971-87. The collective presented its productions in Switzerland, Germany and Austria. Their activities were funded by the City of Bern.

In 1979/80, Klassen lived for one year in New York City.

Between 1980 and 1997, Klassen held a teaching position at the Schauspielschule am Konservatorium für Musik und Theater Bern, and from 1987 to 1995 he taught at the F+F School for Art and Media Design Zurich.

In 1987, Studio am Montag transformed into STOP Performance Theater (STOP.P.T.). On this occasion, Klassen announced the „death of theatre“, and postulated performance art as the only adequate artistic succession.

In 1992, Klassen received the Sisyphus-Prize awarded by the City of Bern. He returned the prize in 1995 as a protest against the drastic reduction of city subventions for the STOP Performance Theater (STOP.P.T.).

Since 1998, Klassen had been organising the BONE Festival für Aktionskunst at the Schlachthaus Theatre in Bern.

After Klassen's death on 1 December 2011 in Bern, Switzerland, the performance collective Black Market International (BMI) had been bequeathed with Klassen's urn.

=== Selection of the significant performance productions since 1981 ===
- Menschen 2 (1981). Conceived as a project in 108 parts, coproduced by Galerie Lydia Megert, Bern, in collaboration with numerous artists.
- Der Schatten des Feuers (1987)
- Achse Kassel-Bern / 2 x Provinz in collaboration with Jürgen O. Olbrich (1987). For fifteen years, Klassen, an obsessive collector of all sorts, and Olbrich had been working on this long-term project, producing magazines and editions discussing among others the issues collections, archives, artists’ estates, preservation and categorisation. The result of their periodic encounters in Klassen's studio in Bern was an artists’ magazine called No News / 2 x Provinz, reflecting their life and work situation at the time.
- Das Brakteaten Stück (1987). 24-hour performance presented as part of the performance program of Documenta 8, Kassel. In collaboration with Jürgen Fritz, Boris Nieslony, Zygmunt Pietrowski and Jacques van Poppel.
- Aus einem vergessenen Projekt (1987)
- Winterreise (1988/1992). Performance of twelve hours based the poem by Franz Schubert.
- Performance Art Netzwerk (1989–90). Performance of thirteen months, held at Galerie Lydia Megert, Bern.
- Hamletmaschine by Heiner Müller (1997). Presented by STOP Performance Theater at Kleintheater Kramgasse 6 in Bern.
- Kaufrausch/Intoxication by shopping. Stadtgalerie Bern (2004); Kunsthaus Grenchen (2005). In the collaborative performance as part of their long-term project Achse Kassel-Bern / 2 x Provinz, Norbert Klassen and Jürgen O. Olbrich sold elements of Klassen's collection at discount prices over three days each. A last performance had been planned for 2012, inviting visitors into the studio of Klassen in Bern, to choose and pay the price they want for any object of his vast collection. On 30 and 31 May 2012, Olbrich presented the performance on Klassen's birthday in his memory at his studio. Klassen's whole estate had been dedicated as performance material, and the public could acquire collected material, originals, editions and more.
- Vivat Fluxus. Performance presented among others at 7a*11d International Festival of Performance Art in Toronto, Canada (2008) and at Performer Stammtisch in Berlin (2009). The work includes classic Fluxus instructions from the 60s, read out and executed by the artist.
- The Art of Making Art. Performance presented among others at the Kasseler Kunstvereinsheim, Kassel (2007), PROGR_Zentrum für Kulturproduktion, Bern and 7a*11d International Festival of Performance Art in Toronto, Canada (2008). In this work about the art market and value of art, the artist writes the word ART on his skin by cutting.

=== Black Market International ===
In 1985, Klassen was one of the founders of the international performance collective Black Market International, in which he worked together with Boris Nieslony, Lee Wen, and others, until his death in 2011. The collective bases its work among others on the principle that “all is possible”, and continues participating in numerous performance art festivals worldwide.

== Bibliography ==
- Gerhard Johann Lischka, Norbert Klassen, PerformanceArtNetzwerk. Bern/Wabern: Benteli, 1992. ISBN 9783716508282.
- Jean Grädel (2005). "Norbert Klassen". In Andreas Kotte (ed.). Theaterlexikon der Schweiz / Dictionnaire du théâtre en Suisse / Dizionario Teatrale Svizzero / Lexicon da teater svizzer [Theater Dictionary of Switzerland] (in German). Vol. 2. Zürich: Chronos. pp. 995–996. ISBN 978-3-0340-0715-3. LCCN 2007423414. OCLC 62309181.
- Fritz Franz Vogel, “I am a network. Die Berner Performance-Szene: Vom Studio am Montag zur global vernetzten Wahlverwandtschaft” in Stefan Koslowski, Andreas Kotte, Andreas, Reto Sorg, Berner Almanach Theater, Volume 3. Bern: Stämpfli, 2000.
- Kasseler Kunstvereinsheim: Juni bis September 2007, Kasseler Kunstvereinsheim: Kassel. ISBN 978-3-927941-49-6.
- Sibylle Omlin, Performativ! Performance-Künste in der Schweiz. Ein Reader. Zurich: Pro Helvetia, 2004.
- perforum.ch, Pius Freiburghaus, Human Performance. Essays zur Schweizer Performance Kunst der 90er Jahre. Bern/Wabern: Benteli, 2004.
- Jürgen O. Olbrich, Save /Give - Der Kunst das Leben zurückerobern - Life is Art enough, Exhibition catalgogue Kasseler Kunstverein. With contributions by Claus Böhmler, Wolfgang Hainke, Bernhard Heidsieck, Udo Idelberger, Wilhelm Koch, Emmett Williams, Jürgen O. Olbrich, Norbert Klassen, Allan Kaprow. 1995. ISBN 3-927941-12-3.
- Marcel Bleuler, Gabriel Flückiger, Renée Magaña (Hrsg.), Norbert Klassen - "Warum applaudiert ihr nicht?”, Berne: Stämpfli Verlag, 2015. ISBN 978-3-7272-1452-3.

== See also ==
- Performance art
- Fluxus
- Experimental theater
- Living Theatre
- Black Market International (BMI)
- Lee Wen
- Intermedia
- List of performance artists
