= Konger =

Konger is a Polish performance art group from Kraków, Poland, established in 1983 by a group of professional artists in protest against the imposition of Martial law in Poland. The artists boycotted all state galleries and took up performance art instead, an obsolete medium in the eyes of the official art critics.

The Group was founded by Wladyslaw Kazmierczak, Artur Tajber, Marian Figiel and Marcin Krzyżanowski. Others included Kazimierz Madej and Peter Grzybowski. The activity was documented by Barbara Maroń.

The artists performed individual art actions at a time when Polish performance art was experiencing political repressions. The performance in Zakład nad Fosą was transmitted live through video equipment and monitors outside the gallery.

The performances of Konger Group triggered strong criticism from the Polish authorities and resulted in a ban on performing in public for Artur Tajber, issued by the local committee of the Polish United Workers' Party.

== Selected performances ==
- 28.03.1984 Krzysztofory Gallery, Kraków (Wladyslaw Kazmierczak, Marian Figiel, Marcin Krzyżanowski, Artur Tajber.
- 1984 (April) Zakład nad Fosą Gallery (Wladyslaw Kazmierczak, Marian Figiel, Kazimierz Madej, Peter Grzybowski, Artur Tajber) – "The Week of Zakład nad Fosą Festival", Wrocław.
- 1985 BWA Gallery in Zielona Góra, the 1st Biennale of New Art.
- 1990 BWA Gallery in Kraków (as a part of DOTYK (TOUCH) exhibition – the iconography of Polish independent art).

The artists stopped performing as a group in 1990 but remain active individually.
