= Peter Grzybowski =

- Born: 16 June 1954
- Died: 29 August 2013 (aged 59)
- Education: Academy of Fine Arts, Kraków
- Movement: Performance art

Peter Grzybowski (16 June 1954 in Kraków, Poland – 29 August 2013) was a Polish multimedia and performance artist and a painter. He studied at the Faculty of Painting of the Academy of Fine Arts in Kraków (ASP), graduating in 1982. He first performed in 1981. He was a figure in the Polish performance art movement of the 1980s, performing individually and with Awacs Group (1982–1987) and KONGER (1984–1986). From 1985 he lived in the USA.

Until 1996 he had exhibited painting works (e.g. in OK Harris Gallery, New York, Fusion Arts Museum, New York, DeCordova Museum Lincoln, MA, Joslyn Art Museum, Omaha, NE, National Building Museum Washington DC, Muzeum Sztuki Lodz, Galleria Arsenal, Poznan, Exchange Gallery, Lodz, Bunkier Sztuki Gallery Kraków, Zachęta Gallery Warsaw, Grand Palais and others).

His paintings imitate objects such as photographs, boards, marble and metal plates. They are included in collections such as: John Hechinger Collection, Norton Center for the Arts, Bob Rotchild Collection, Michael Rakosi Collection, Raymond and Arlene Zimmerman Collection, Exchange Gallery and many other collections in USA, Canada, France, Germany and Poland.

He created multimedia performances and installations, in which he used computers, digital video, sound, UV lighting (the installations were shown e.g. at Entropia Gallery in Wroclaw, and New York galleries TIXE, Fusion Arts Museum and Now Gallery as well as interactive CD-ROMs (e.g. presented among others, at the International Art Meetings in Katowice 2000, WRO International Festival in Wroclaw 2001 and Chashama in New York 2002).

He has been a participant of many international festivals and performance events (such as Open International Performance Art Festival in Beijing, the International Performance Art Festival "Castle of Imagination", Poland 2000 and 2006, IIPAE Jakarta, Indonesia 2006, Interakcje – Piotrków Trybunalski, Poland 2006, Chashama New York 2002–2006, Coalition Performance Festival, Chile 2005, Judson Memorial Church New York 2004, New Yorkers Festival at Center of Contemporary Arts in Warsaw 2004, Forum Social Europeen Berlin, Paris 2003, Fort Sztuki Kraków 1998–2000, Franklin Furnace New York 1987, Cooper Union School of Art New York 1987, C.U.A.N.D.O Center New York 1986, Art Now Gallery Mannheim 1983). He was a member of Fort Sztuki Association and International Association of Performance Art Organizers (IAPAO), an organizer (curator) of "Kesher" performance events and festivals in USA and Poland. With Małgorzata Kaźmierczak he is also a co-founder (formerly a vice-president) of the Foundation for the Promotion of Performance Art "Kesher" in Kraków (Poland).
