= Annabel Guérédrat and Henri Tauliaut =

Annabel Guérédrat and Henri Tauliaut are a performance art pair based in Martinique and co-founders of FIAP, an international festival of performance art based there.

Guérédrat (b. 1974) is a choreographer and dancer and Tauliaut a visual artist. They started working together in 2015, when Tauliaut invited Guérédrat to be in Nude Descending a Staircase and have made over twelve performances, taking place in Martinique, Guadeloupe, the French department north of Martinique, Jamaica, and the United States. Their pieces include The Smell of Success, which involved Guérédrat blessing the graves of the deceased with scented liquid at Guadeloupe's Morne-à-l'Eau cemetery and the series Parade Nuptiale Iquanesque. Their pieces operate under the principle of the four golden positions: standing, lying, walking, and sitting.

Guérédrat is also the founder of the nonprofit performance group Artincidence, based in Trois-Îlets, Martinique.

A recent performance from 2017 is La Machi, the Mangoose y la serpiente, which they executed at the Impératrice Hotel in Fort-de-France the first night of FIAP 17.
