= Alastair MacLennan =

Scottish artist and educator (born 1943)

Alastair MacLennan (born 1943 in Blair Atholl, Perthshire, Scotland) is one of Britain's major practitioners of live art. Since 1975, he is based in Belfast, Northern Ireland. He is a founding member of Belfast's Bbeyond Performance Art International. before that he was a founder member of Belfast's Art and Research Exchange. He is member of the performance art collective Black Market International (BMI).

He studied at the Duncan of Jordanstone College of Art and Design of the University of Dundee in 1960–65. 1966-68 he received his Master of Fine Arts from the School of the Art Institute of Chicago, Chicago. He now is emeritus professor in fine art, University of Ulster in Belfast, honorary fellow of the Dartington College of Arts, Devon, and honorary associate of the National Review of Live Art, Glasgow. He retired from his professorship in 2008 and continues as emeritus professor for fine art, University of Ulster.

MacLennan's live work is prevailingly long durational. Early on MacLennan decided never to contract with a gallery or commercial dealer formally. He believed his art is a spiritual practice where the artist shares the whole process with the public who experience the process as it is created, not just an artwork but a process of exploration and discovery. There should be no separation between the process and the making and the final result; it must remain all one. In later years MacLennan evolved a practice informed by Zen insights. MacLennan has a worldwide following among artists, critics, and art historians. One outcome of how MacLennan's practice is that he did not build relationships with museums. The Ulster Museum has 129 works on paper. More than 100 are in the Demarco European Art Foundation Archive, Edinburgh. Another large cache of drawings and objects are in the Summerhall Arts Collection, Edinburgh. Several publications are being planned to give a history and complete overview of MacLennan's seminal history. He is very probably the world's most experienced performance artist. It is inconceivable that any other has performed so often or in so many different parts of the world. MacLennan says, as is also true of the great performance artist Joseph Beuys, all his performances are part of a single gesamtkunstwerk continuum.

Alastair MacLennan represented Ireland at the Venice Biennale, with inter-media work commemorating the names of all those who died as a result of the Political Troubles in Northern Ireland, from 1969 to then date (1997). During the 1970s and 1980s he made some long, non-stop performances in Britain, America and Canada, of up to 144 hours duration. Subject matter dealt with political, social and cultural malfunction. In recent years he has traveled extensively in Europe, Asia, North America and Canada, presenting Actuations (performance/installations). Since 1989 he has been a member of the performance art entity, Black Market International, which performs globally.

During the 1970s and 1980s he presented long durational performances in Britain and America, of up to 144 hours. His work looks into political, social, religious, ethical and aesthetical questions. He has performed since 1972 more than 600 art performances in countries across the world, in galleries, museums, festivals and public spaces. His most recent performances were in the 2017 Edinburgh Festival including performing with Sandra Johnston at Summerhall alongside his second retrospective of works on paper and objects and installations relating to his performances entitled Lie To Lay and a catalogue entitled Air A Lair. His first retrospective was at The Ormeau Baths Gallery Belfast with a catalogue publication called Knot Knot, 2003.

MacLennan performs often with Sandra Johnston. She is an artist from Northern Ireland working in areas of site-responsive performance that like MacLennan explores creative responses in the aftermath of trauma, such as, acts of commemoration that exist as forms of testimony and empathetic encounter. Johnston is the ‘Ré Soupault’ Guest Professor at the Bauhaus University, Weimar, and Course Leader of the BxNU MFA at Northumbria University, England, and is also a co-founder of two artist-run collectives in Belfast, Catalyst Arts & BBeyond.

For MacLennan's performances and installations he uses the term “Actuations”. In Autumn 2017, he is performing in several cities in North America.

== See also ==
- Black Market International (BMI)
- Lee Wen
- Norbert Klassen
- List of performance artists
