= Nelda Ramos =

Argentine performance artist (born 1977)

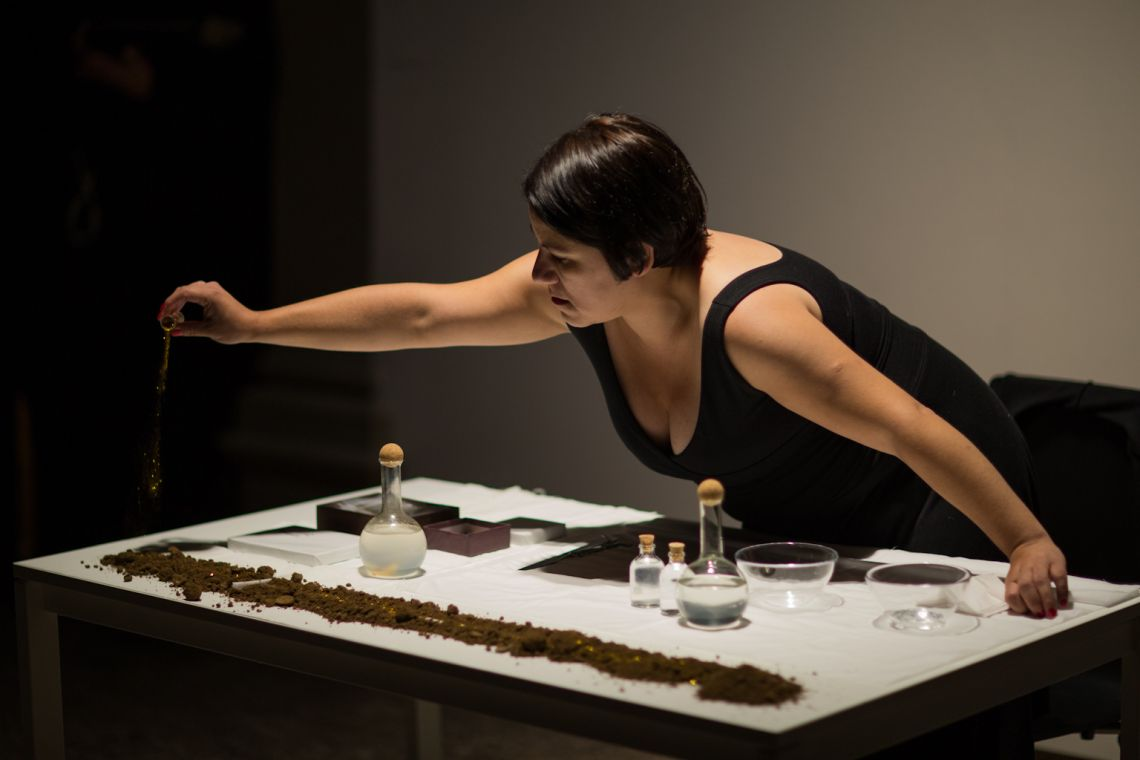
- Nelda at the Venice International Performance Art Week (2012)
- Born: October 4, 1977 (age 48); Caballito, Buenos Aires, Argentina
- Style: Performance art; Action art; Mail art
- Spouse: Roberto Ruiz

Nelda Daniela Ramos (born October 4, 1977) is an Argentine multidisciplinary artist, curator and art educator known for her performance art. Working with performance, object and photography, the dynamics of Ramos' works are often reflecting the essence and political issues of being a woman in the Latin American context. Her performance art work conveys a deep connection between nature, body and spirit, and often stimulate the audience to be fully involved into the hybridization occurring between nature and the artist.

== Biography ==
Ramos studied visual arts and teaching at the Carlos Morel School of Fine Arts (EMBA) also known as Carlos Morel Escuela Municipal de Bellas Artes in Quilmes and at National University of La Plata (UNLP), as well as engraving and printed arts. She currently works as a teacher in several educational institutions and as coordinator of the Postgraduate Program in Media and Technology for the Painting Production at the Universidad Nacional de las Artes in Buenos Aires.

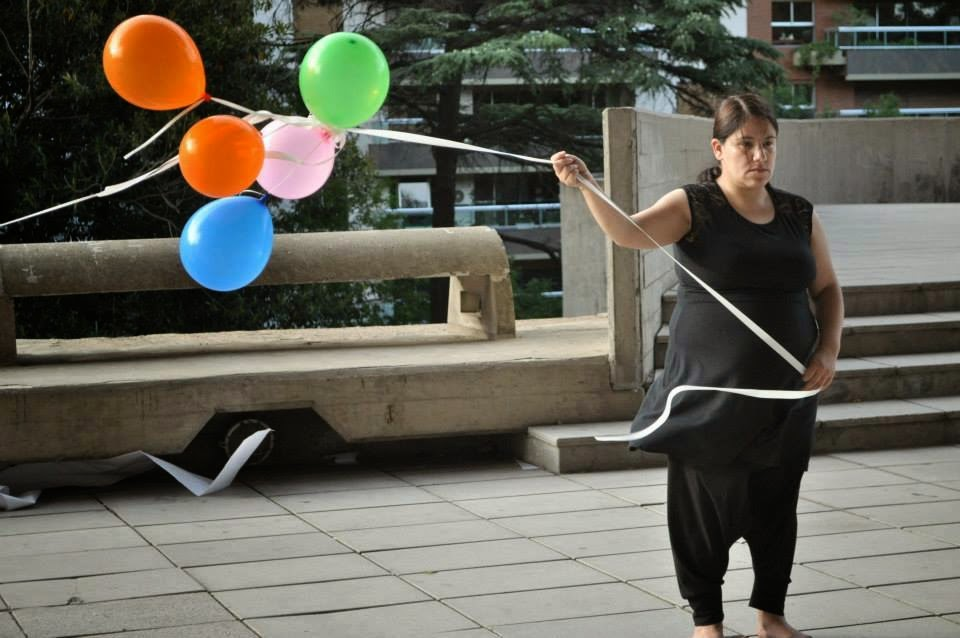
Nelda at the National Library in Buenos Aires (2014)

Since 2000, Ramos has participated in several events related to different disciplines such as performance art, mail art and ceramics. Her works were shown in Argentina, Brazil, Chile, Uruguay, Peru, Ecuador, Colombia, Canada, USA, Italy and Albania.

Ramos explains most of her roots, influences and role as a self managed artist in the Latin American context, in an online paper called "Arte de Acción. Agitación Cultural desde el Río de la Plata desde una perspectiva de la autogestión" (Action Art. Cultural Agitation in Rio de la Plata from a perspective of self-management) (In Spanish).

== Curation ==
Dates	Title	Curator(s)	Location
2006 – 2010	Zonadeartenacción	Nelda Ramos and Gabriela Alonso	Quilmes and Autonomous City of Buenos Aires, Argentina
2009, 2011	Exchange of Artistic Processes (Intercambio de Procesos Artísticos)	Nelda Ramos and Mónica García	Una Casa, British Arts Centre, IUNA; Retiro, Buenos Aires and Palermo, Buenos Aires, Argentina
2011	Super Action Saturdays (Sábados de Super Acción)	Nelda Ramos and Articultores	OnceLibre; Plaza Miserere, Buenos Aires, Argentina
2012	Fraternal Love – Poetics of Exchange (Amor Fraterno – Poéticas del Intercambio)	Nelda Ramos and Graciela Ovejero Postigo	Peras de Olmo, Palermo, Buenos Aires, Argentina

=== Zonadeartenacción performance art festival ===
Gabriela Alonso, an Argentine artist, created Zonadearte, an art gallery which wanted to show the most innovative artistic expressions located in Quilmes, south of Buenos Aires. Nelda joined Gabriela in 2006 and they organized together the festival of action art and urban interventions. Zonadeartenacción, active until 2010, became a multi-disciplinary event that hosts exhibitions including the areas of design, clothing, object, mail art, installation art, urban interventions, visual and sonorous poetry. In spite of that, talented international and national artists participated in this festival, such as VestAndPage, Sinead O'Donnell, Irene Loughlin, and many others.
