= Zheng Lianjie =

Chinese contemporary artist (born 1962)

- Born: 7 August 1962 (age 64); Beijing, China

Zheng Lianjie
- Chinese: 郑连杰
Transcriptions

Zheng Lianjie (born 7 August 1962) is a Chinese contemporary artist, active in performance art, installation, photography, contemporary ink and video art. Zheng Lianjie is a representative figure in Chinese contemporary art. He is part of a generation of artists who grew up in China during the Cultural Revolution and in the 1980s turned from traditional forms of painting to installation art and performance-based work

== Life and work ==
Born in 1962 in Beijing, Zheng Lianjie is a representative figure among the group of Chinese artists working abroad. Zheng divides his time between Beijing and New York. As a teenager, he studied traditional Chinese calligraphy and poetry and has continued to devote himself to the further exploration of ink painting and calligraphy over the past 30 years. His work spans a wide array of genres and styles, including calligraphy, contemporary ink painting, performance art, video, installation, sculpture, and conceptual photography.

In the early 1980s, Zheng spent 3 years at Palace Museum in Beijing studying traditional Chinese painting. In 1986, Zheng founded one of the earliest painting schools in Beijing, “Beijing Earth Calligraphy and Painting Art School.” In 1992, Zheng's ink painting “Dance of the East” was awarded the Gold Prize in Korea's 9th International Art Show. The Korean Association of Artists held an award ceremony in Zheng's honor at the Tianlun Dynasty Hotel, which was widely covered in the local media, including Xinhua News Agency, CCTV, China Daily and China Youth Daily Newspaper. This early exposure introduced Zheng's artistic achievements to a much wider audience and heralded him as the first Chinese artist to initiate cultural and artistic exchange between China and Korea.

Moving into the mid-1980s, Zheng started experimenting with contemporary ink, and traveling all over China. He participated in Beijing's Yuanmingyuan art group in the late 1980s.(following Tiananmen Square protests of 1989) It was also during this time that Zheng began to become known for his subversive and critical stance toward conservative artistic language and pursuit of a new independent and individualistic style. He once said in early 1990s: “Avant-garde art should be a sharp knife, a weeping flower”. Zheng turned to performance and installation art in the late 1980s. He is one of the earliest artists in China to integrate performance art with the natural environment.

Zheng immigrated to the United States in 1996, while he continued to explore the experimental side of contemporary ink painting and calligraphy, he also continued to use his body itself as a means to ponder immigration, assimilation and the different psychological challenges faced by individuals and society from different cultural backgrounds. Several performance pieces from this period would become important chapters of contemporary Chinese performance art history.

Between 2004 and 2008, Zheng Lianjie returned to China once a year to make a pilgrimage to the holy Taoist Mount Hua. During his time on Huashan, Zheng meditated with a Taoist monk, an experience that would have a profound impact on his ink paintings and calligraphy from this period. Zheng's works fuses Taoism and natural aesthetics together, earning great critical acclaim. Zheng's work has been included in numerous exhibitions, symposiums and public art projects held all over the world. During the 2000s, Zheng Lianjie delivered invited talks and held exhibitions at major universities, including Harvard and Columbia. His work has also been featured in major media outlets such as The New York Times and The Asahi Shimbun. His works have been collected by museums, galleries, universities and several international private collectors.

In 2012, Zhenglianjie was named as United Nations Messenger of Peace in LinZhou, China in recognition of his distinguished achievement in the art field.

== Selected artworks ==
- 1989, 1994, 1995 Contemporary ink series: “Tiananmen,” “Journal On The Sea,” “Rock & Roll Narrative,” “West Mountain in Wind and Rain,” “Spring,” “Black Rain,” “Dance of Death.”
- 1989, Installation: “For Forgotten Time”
- 1989–1993, Contemporary ink series: “The Wall” (a series of ink paintings commemorating the German reunification)
- 1990, Performance Photography: “Showering in Gray Wind” (performance photography at the Simatai Section of The Great Wall)
- 1993，Mixed media performance series: “Huge Explosion: Binding The Lost Soul.” (For this large scale outdoor performance/installation piece, Zheng Lianjie mobilized more than a hundred people including peasants from villages near the Great Wall and college students to participate. The project spanned 17 days and utilized traditional Chinese religious rituals to examine social reality and delve into personal trauma. This work has had a lasting impact on the Chinese art world since the 1990s and has been subject of numerous critical studies.)
- 1998, Performance art: “Subzero New York” (New York)
- 1999, Performance art: “X-RAY “(New York)
- 2000, Performance art: “Time/Line-2000” (Beijing)
- 2001, Performance art: “Floating Table” (Beijing)
- 2001–present, Performance art series: “American Wasteland” (New York)
- 1998–present, New Ink Painting Series: “After the Century,” “New York memories，“City ruins,” “Commemorating 911,” “Zero scenery.”
- 1997–2003, Performance video trilogy: “Uniform” (1997)，“Apple” (2001), “Face” (2003).
- 2004–2008, Performance video series: “Huashan Project: Ode to the Mountain”，“Huashan Project：Snow”. (Ink painting and photography series on Mount Hua).
- 2004–2007, photography: “Tao of Huashan” series.
- 2005–present, Public art design: “Shanghai Pavilion” (New York), “Roseland” (New York).

== Exhibitions ==
- 2011 Inter Mediate Contemporary Chinese art exhibition at The College of New Jersey Art Gallery
- 2010 Natura contemporary Art Crossing Art Gallery Hillwood Art Museum Long Island University New York
- 2009 Over the Wall Contemporary Art Next Gallery New York
- 2008 21st Century Ink Academic Exhibition China National Art Gallery
- 2008 Chinese Traditions Reconfigured Amy Simon Fine Art, Connecticut U.S.A.
- 2007 Made in China Chinese Contemporary Art Louisiana Museum of Modern Art Humlebaek Denmark
- 2007 the Israel Museum in Jerusalem China Onward The Estella Collection Contemporary Art, 1966－2006
- 2007 Against the Wall Contemporary Chinese Artists Corkin Gallery Toronto
- 2007 The Power of The Universe The Frontier of Contemporary Chinese Art Asia Art Center Beijing
- 2006 Albright–Knox Art Gallery, University at Buffalo Anderson Gallery and Center for the Arts New York U.S.A
- 2006 New Chinese Occidentalism-Chinese Contemporary Art in New York Ethan Cohen Fine Arts
- 2006 East transplanted West CAS Gallery Kean University U.S.A.
- 2006 International Chinese live art festival Performance Art of Zheng Lianjie (video slide discussion ) Manchester English
- 2005 The Wall Reshaping Contemporary Chinese Art 2005-2006 Millennium Art Museum Beijing China
- 2004 Colgate University Performance Art of ZhengLianjie (video slide discussion) U.S.A.
- 2003 Swarthmore College Performance Art of ZhengLianjie (video slide discussion) U.S.A
- 2002 Contemporary Ink Works by Zheng Lianjie (solo exhibition) Agama Gallery, New York, NY
- 2002 Reappearing Exit IV: Performance Art of Zheng Lianjie (solo exhibition)Asian American Arts Centre, New York, U.S.A.
- 2002 Selected works of performance Art (exhibition/discussion) The 2nd Annual International Photography Festival, Pingyao, China
- 2002 The First Guangzhou Triennial, China (group exhibition/discussion) Guangzhou, China Performance Art of Zheng Lianjie (video slide discussion )
- 2000 Conceptual Ink” (group exhibition) Ethan Cohen Fine Arts, New York, NY
- 2000 Documentation of Chinese Avant-Garde Art in the 90's (group exhibition) Fukuoka Asian Art Museum, Fukuoka, Japan
- 1998 Binding The Lost Souls;Huge Explosion (video discussion) Harvard University Ye-ching Library
- 1993 Modern Chinese Painting” (group exhibition) National Contemporary Art Society of Israel
- 1992 Contemporary Chinese Art” (group exhibition) Brussels Art Festival, Brussels, Belgium
- 1991 Korea's Ninth Annual International Art Exhibition Seoul, Korea (awarded First Prize)
- 1990 New Works by Zheng Lianjie and Huan Zi (two person exhibition) Sponsored by the Cultural Bureau of the British Embassy, Beijing
- 1990 Ink Revolution (solo exhibition) Beijing Daqian Gallery, Beijing, China
