= Brian Feldman (artist) =

American fringe theater performance artist

- Occupation: performance artist
- Years active: 2003–present

Brian Feldman (born April 1, 1981) is an American fringe theatre performance artist whose work often involves "bizarre feats of endurance".

== Background ==
Feldman was raised in Orlando, Florida, where as a child he performed in television commercials for Disney and Nickelodeon. His parents, Edward Feldman and Marilyn Wattman-Feldman, and sister, Adrienne McIntosh, have all participated in his performance art. He is based in Washington, DC and Orlando, and has received fellowships from the DC Commission on the Arts and Humanities and the Florida Division of Cultural Affairs.

== Performances ==
Feldman's first performance art piece, staged in 2003, was The Feldman Dynamic, in which Feldman, his parents, and sister have dinner onstage before an audience. The Feldman Dynamic was later staged as part of the New York Fringe Festival.

Other shows involving his parents have included 24 Hour Embrace on Father's Day in 2011, in which Feldman and his father hugged 24 hours inside a boxing ring, and 24 Minute Embrace on Mother's Day in 2015, in which Feldman and his mother hugged for 24 minutes each in Orlando, Washington, DC, and Philadelphia.

In a 2010 piece designed to protest Florida's laws against same-sex marriage, called Brian Feldman Marries Anybody, Feldman "promised to legally marry any woman who showed up at the Orange County Courthouse at a specific date and time". Feldman married "relative stranger" Hannah Miller, and the marriage was annulled in 2011.

In the show Dishwasher, Feldman goes to an audience member's home, washes their dishes, and then performs a monologue of the audience member's choosing, ending with the question: "Am I a better actor or dishwasher?" Dishwasher has been performed in Central Florida and in DC as part of the Capital Fringe Festival.

Other Feldman performances include txtshow in DC, in which Feldman gives audience members anonymous Twitter accounts, and then sits onstage reading out messages as they come in; Brian Feldman's William Shakespeare's Macbeth, where he repeated the word "Macbeth" more than 17,000 times over nearly three hours in an amphitheater at Orlando's Lake Eola Park, while wearing a hockey mask in front of an audience given earplugs; and Wawa Shabbawa, in DC and Florida, a shabbat dinner held at a Wawa convenience store.

In 2018, Feldman staged 8 Wards, 8 Nights, an unscripted family dinner performance presented on each night of Hanukkah in a different ward of Washington, D.C. The performances included the lighting of Hanukkah candles, and $2 from each ticket was donated to an organization working in the ward where that night’s performance took place.

== Interpretation ==
Feldman's art frequently makes use of repetition, the passage of time, and audience participation, often revealing "more about the people seeing the show than" about himself. Feldman's work has been compared to Tehching Hsieh and Marina Abramović, but "more playful". Feldman has said of his work: "It’s a little terrifying and fear is a driving force. Fear of the unknown is exciting."
