= Chinese art =

Chinese art

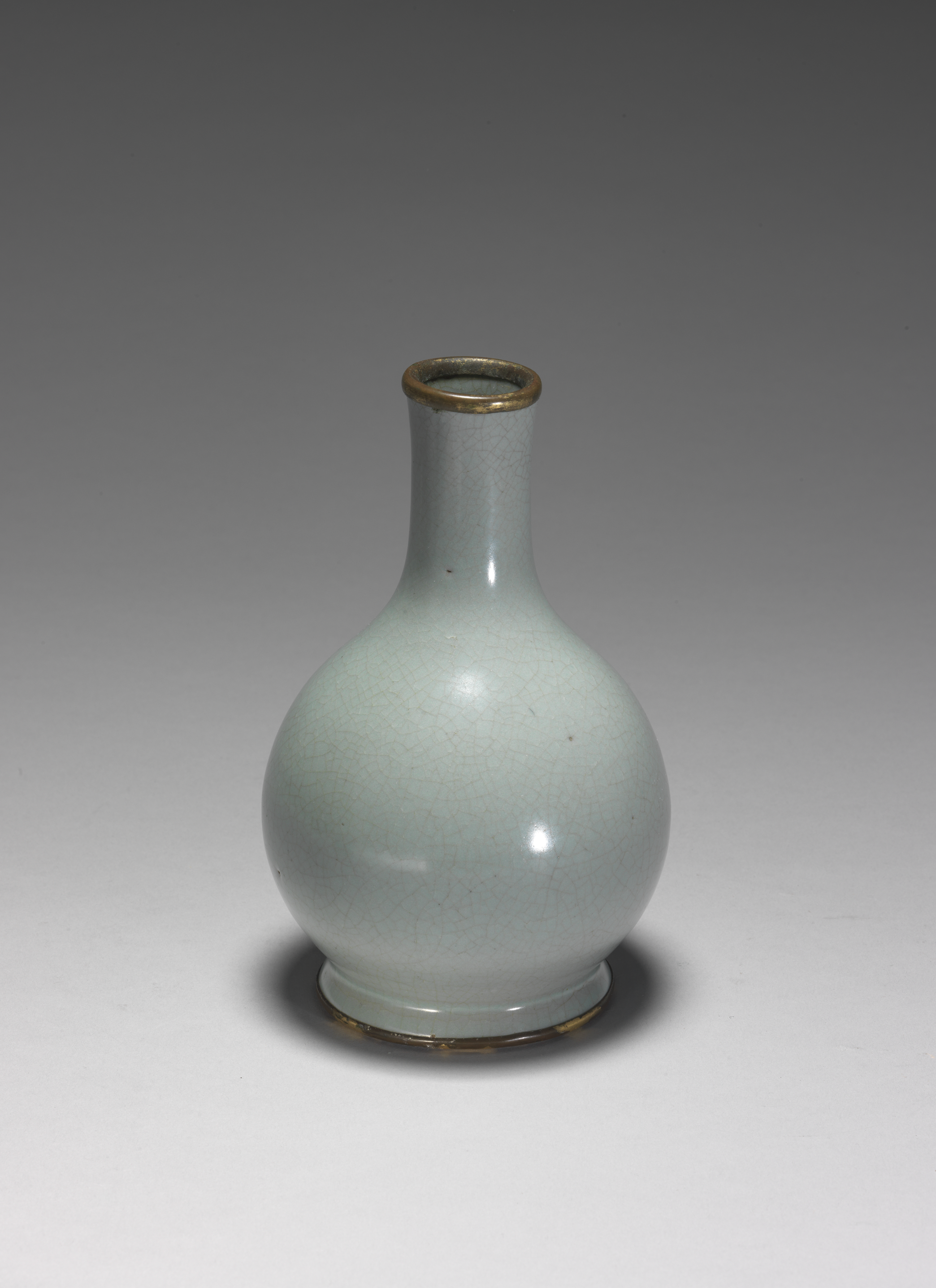
Ru ware celadon-glazed bottle vase, Northern Song dynasty, 11th–12th century, National Palace Museum

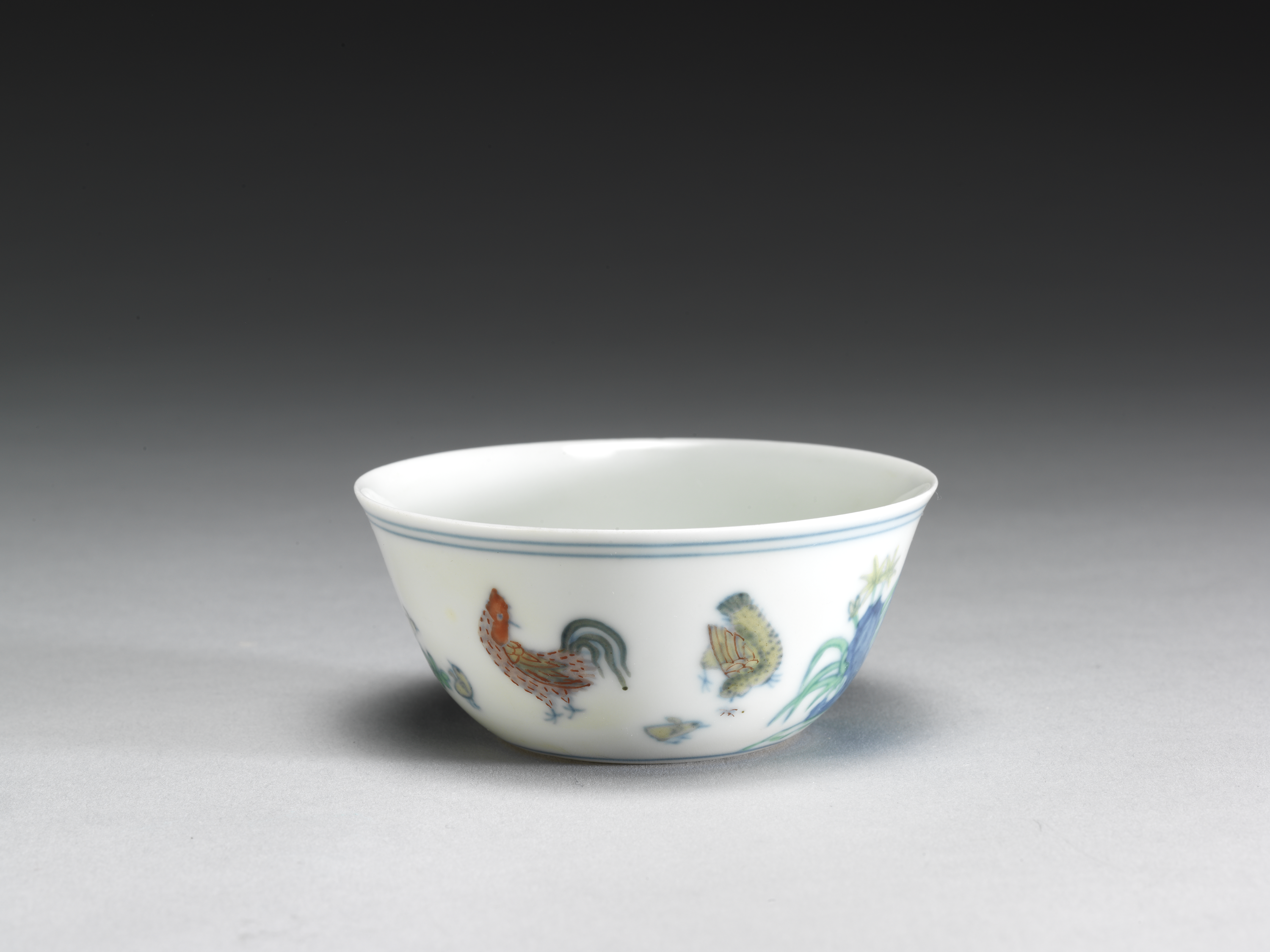
Doucai Chicken Cup (Chenghua), Ming dynasty, 1465–1487 CE, National Palace Museum

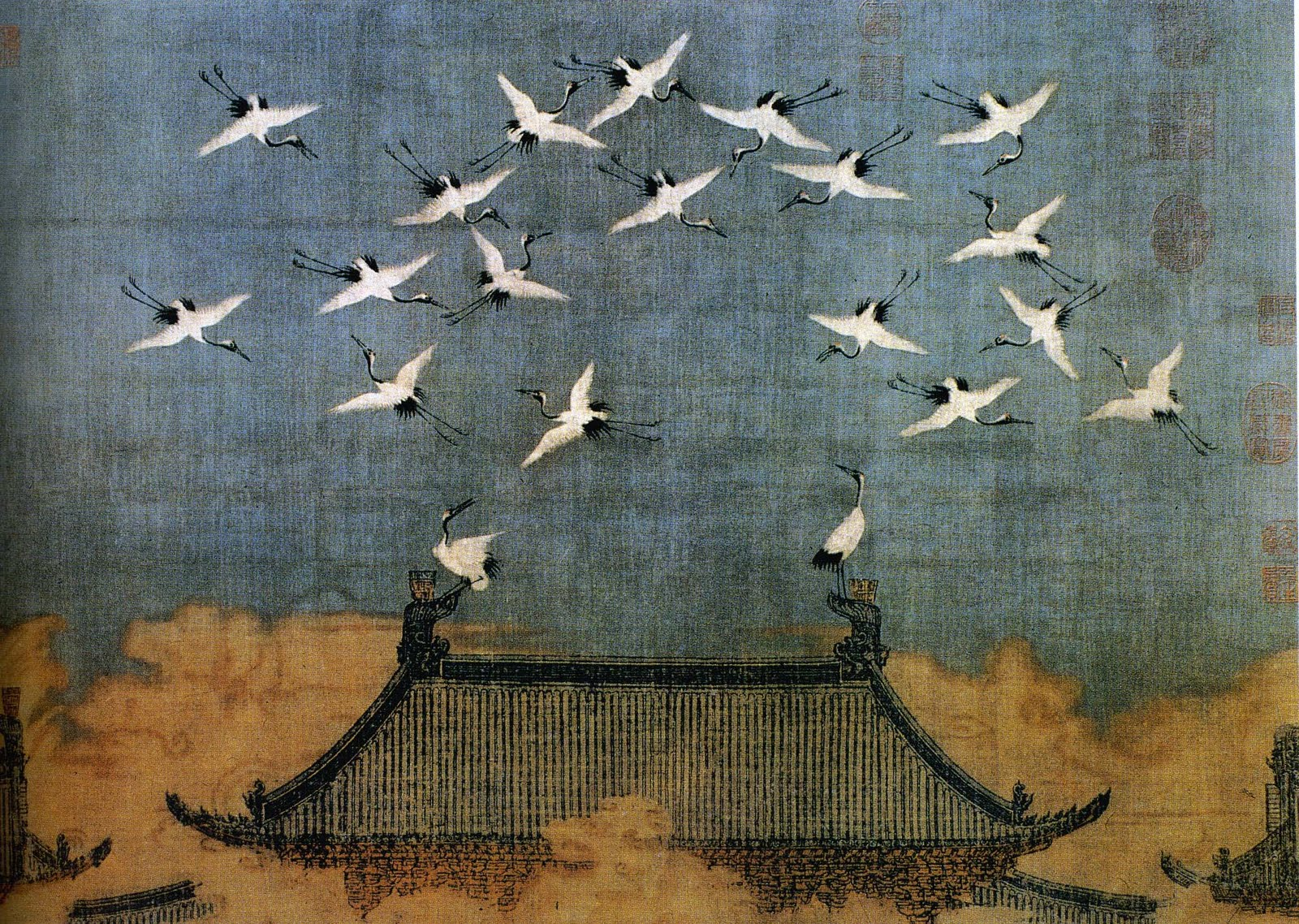
Auspicious Cranes by Emperor Huizong depicting a scene on top of Kaifeng city gate, 16th January 1112, Liaoning Provincial Museum

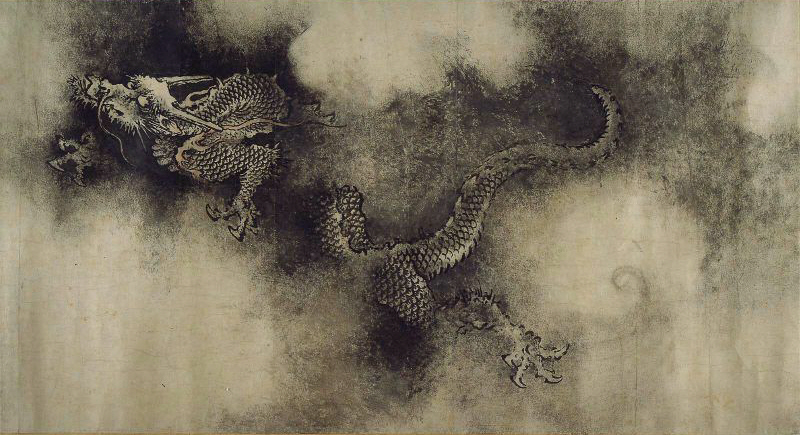
A dragon from Nine Dragons by the Song dynasty painter Chen Rong, 1244, Museum of Fine Arts, Boston

Chinese art is visual art that originated in or is practiced in China, Greater China or by Chinese artists. Art created by Chinese residing outside of China can also be considered a part of Chinese art when it is based on or draws on Chinese culture, heritage, and history. Major art forms include painting, calligraphy, sculpture, architecture, garden design, furniture, ceramics, bronze work, lacquerware, and textiles, sharing motifs and aesthetic principles, and often integrated to create unified environments, encompassing architecture to gardens, interiors, and objects within.

Chinese art exerted a major influence on the arts of Korea, Japan and Vietnam, which adopted and adapted a wide range of its forms, from calligraphy, painting and sculpture to architecture and city planning, garden design, ceramics, lacquerware, furniture, metalwork and textiles, into distinct local traditions. Beyond East Asia, Chinese art shaped painting and ceramics in the Islamic world, and in Europe imported porcelain, lacquer and silk prompted local imitations, as well as the eighteenth-century fashion for chinoiserie in furniture, interiors and garden architecture.

Early "Stone Age art" dates back to 10,000 BC, mostly consisting of simple pottery and sculptures. After that period, Chinese art, like Chinese history, was typically classified by the succession of ruling dynasties of Chinese emperors, most of which lasted several hundred years.

Chinese art is marked by an unusual degree of continuity within, and consciousness of, tradition, lacking an equivalent to the Western collapse and gradual recovery of Western classical styles of art. Decorative arts are extremely important in Chinese art, and much of the finest work was produced in large workshops or factories by essentially unknown artists, especially in Chinese ceramics, where technical mastery served broader aesthetic ideals, subtlety of glaze, purity of form, elevating craft to a medium of contemplation.

Much of the most technically elaborate ceramic work was produced by Imperial factories, though folk kilns and regional workshops also created wares of exceptional artistic merit. In contrast, the tradition of ink wash painting, practiced mainly by scholar-officials and court painters especially of landscapes, flowers, and birds, developed aesthetic values depending on the individual imagination of and objective observation by the artist that are similar to those of the West, but long pre-dated their development there.

Following the establishment of the People's Republic of China in 1949, Socialist Realism became the dominant officially sanctioned style, and traditional arts were subject to ideological scrutiny, particularly during the Cultural Revolution (1966–1976), when much of China's artistic heritage was actively suppressed or destroyed. Since the 1980s, a broad range of traditional art forms have been rehabilitated and revived, while contemporary avant-garde movements have also emerged, gaining international recognition for work that engages critically with both China's artistic heritage and its rapidly changing society.

== History ==
=== Neolithic pottery ===
Early forms of art in China are found in the Neolithic Yangshao culture, which dates back to the 6th millennium BC. Archeological findings such as those at the Banpo have revealed that the Yangshao made pottery; early ceramics were unpainted and most often cord-marked. The first decorations were fish, human faces, and plants, images familiar to the Yangshao people in their agriculturally-oriented lifestyles. These eventually evolved into more colorful, intricate, and abstract designs that featured geometric and astronomy-inspired patterns. Unlike the later Longshan culture, the Yangshao culture did not use pottery wheels in pottery making; rather, they relied on manual techniques like coiling. However, excavations of pieces featuring patterns with parallel lines and grids during the late phase of the Yangshao culture suggest that a spinning method was used to paint the pottery.

Many of the symbols and designs painted held religious and spiritual significance. Patterns featuring frogs and fish represented prosperity, and patterns featuring birds and water represented a respect for nature. Scenes from daily life involving the community, like dances and hunts, likely had significance within Yangshao rituals and ceremonies.

Excavations have found that the Yangshao culture used pottery in the form of urn burials. Analysis of painted urn patterns shows that the designs likely reflected historical events and the lived experiences of the person buried. Urn burials in this sense likely also functioned as a marker of social class, displaying the person's power, heroism, and relevance within the society. Similarly, the Longshan people included pottery, among other artistic creations, like jade artifacts, in their burials of high-status individuals.

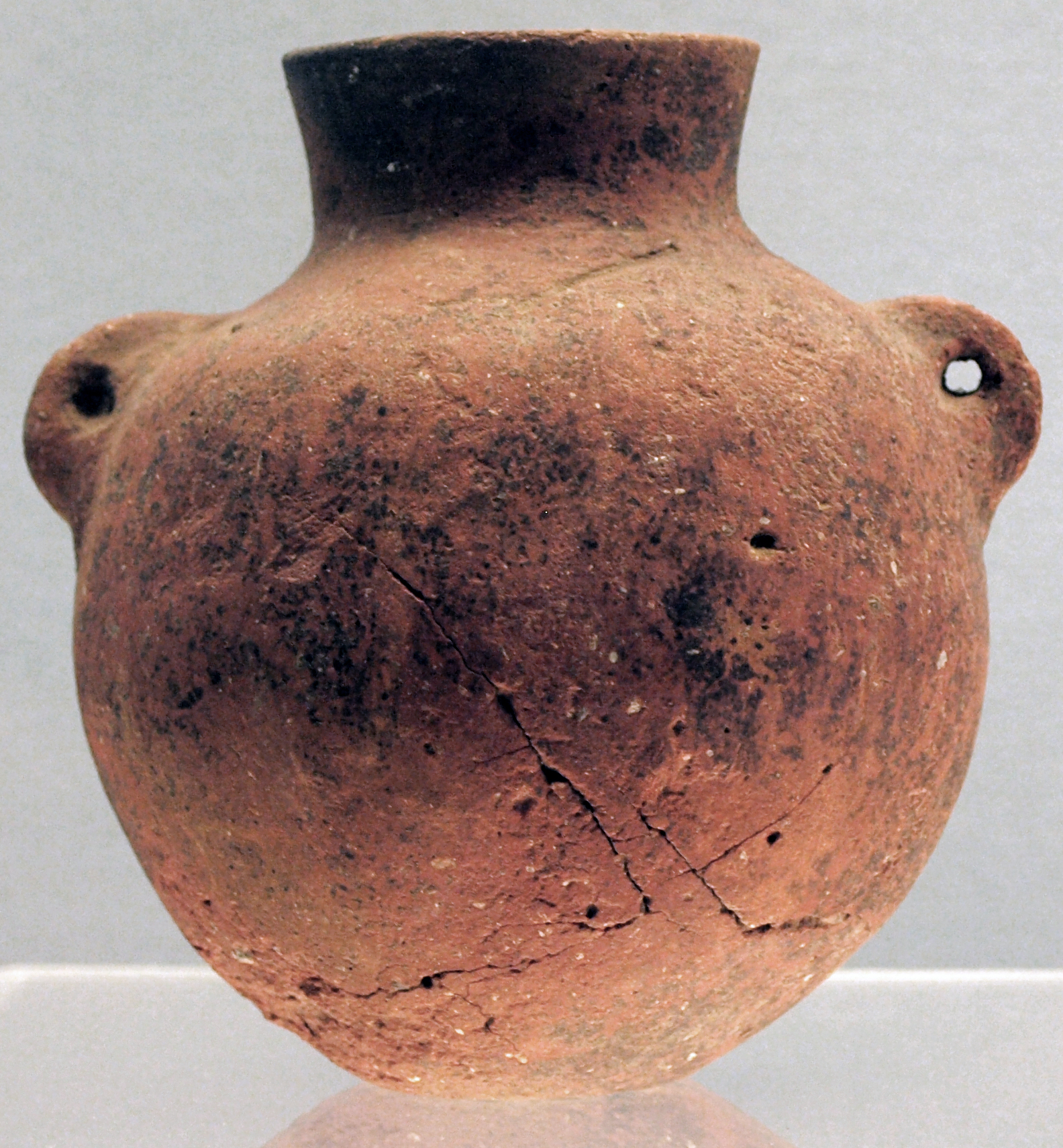
A red pot with two "ears"; by Peiligang culture; 6000–5200 BC; ceramic; Shanghai Museum

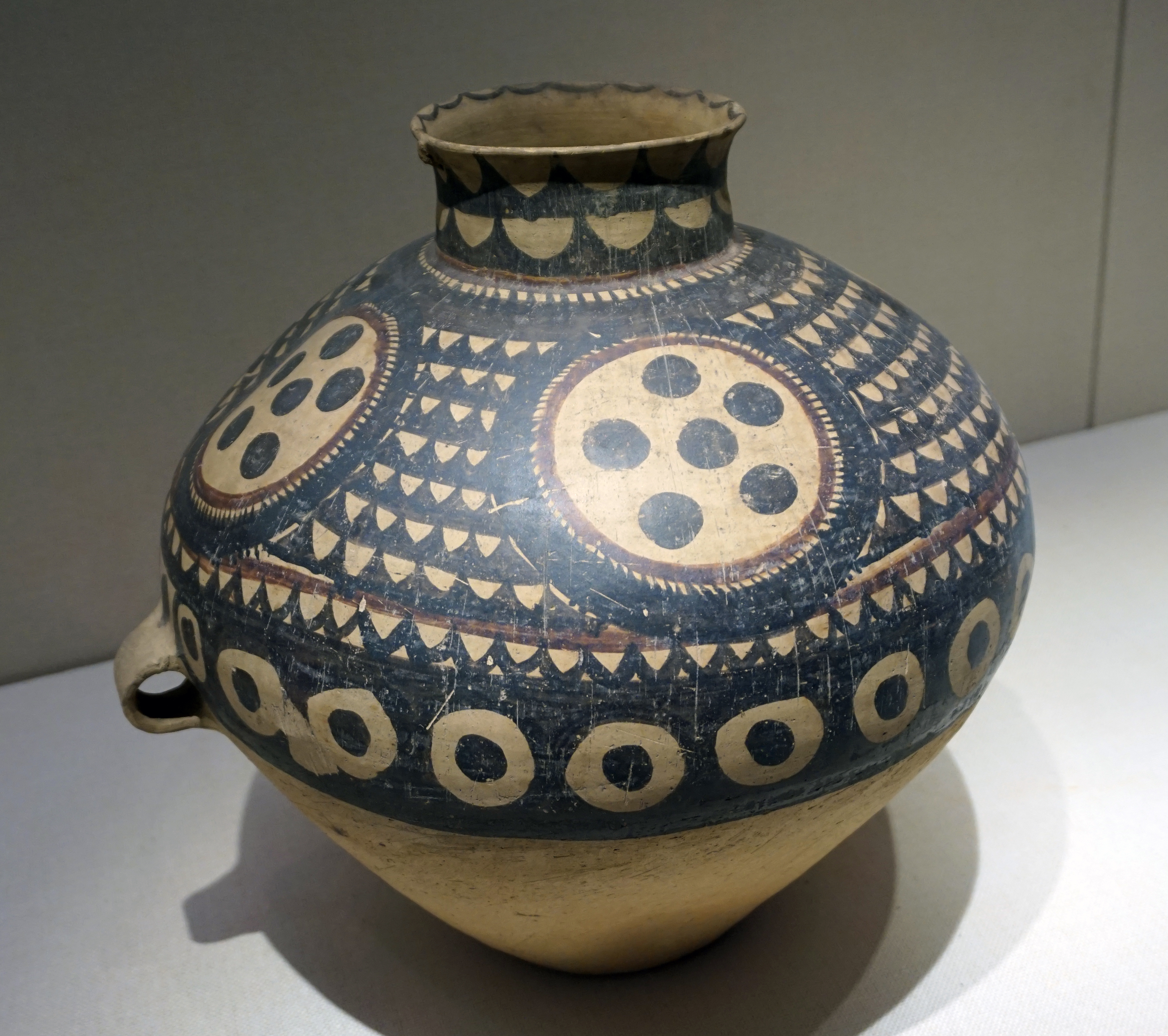
Dotted pottery pot, semi-mountain type; by Yangshao culture from China; 2700–2300 BCE; Gansu Provincial Museum (Lanzhou)

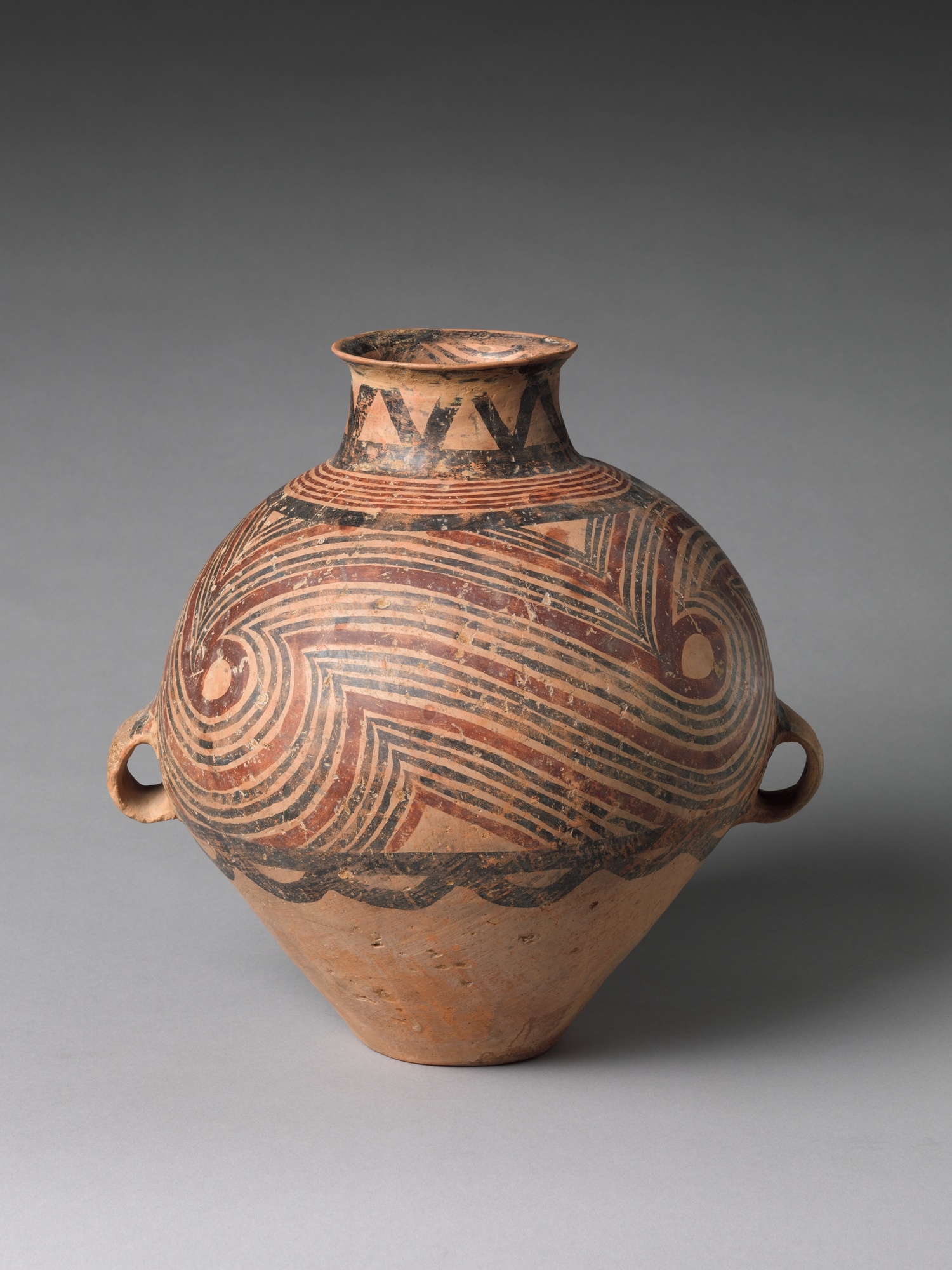
Jar; 2650–2350 BC; earthenware with painted decoration; height: 34 cm; Metropolitan Museum of Art (New York City)

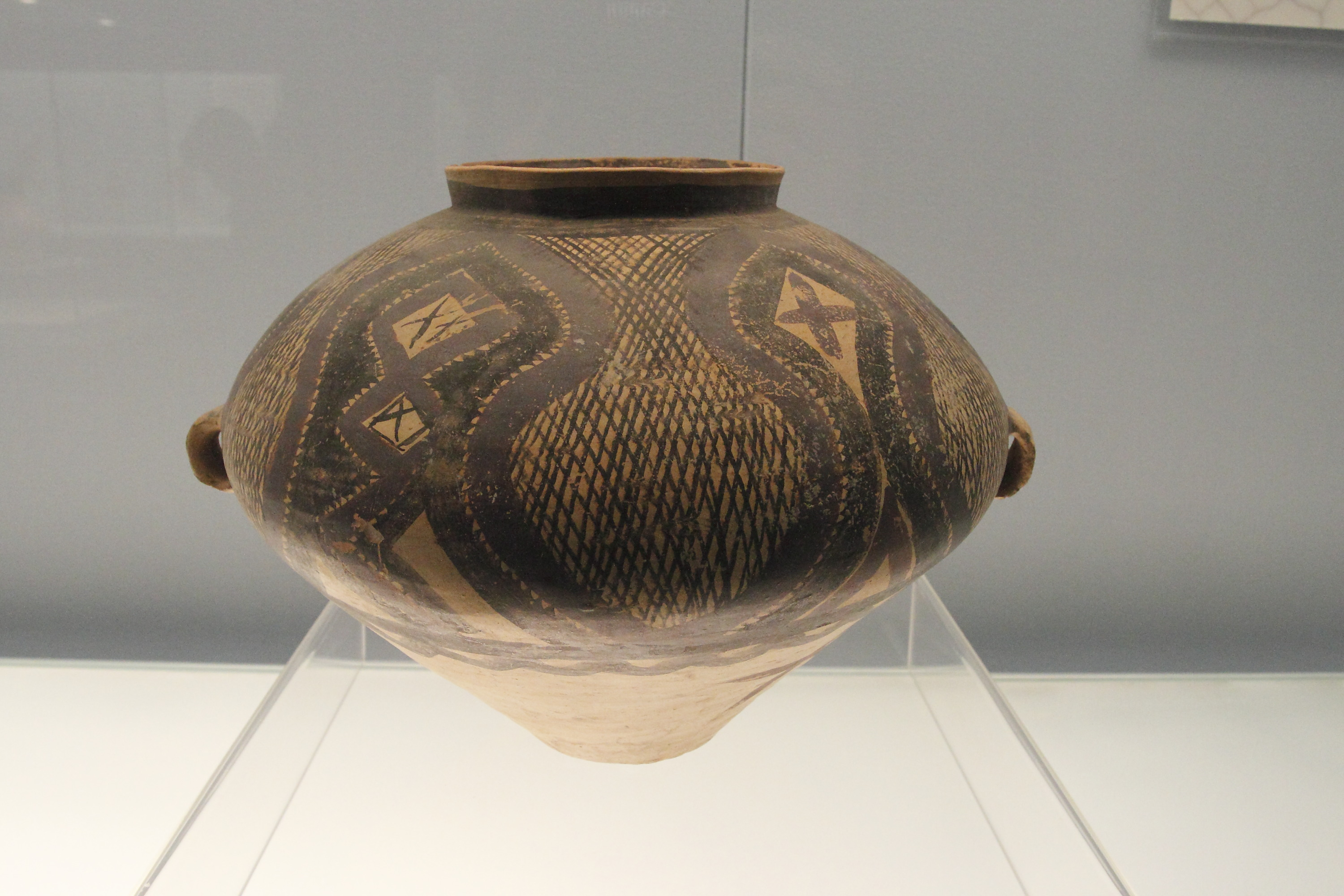
Pot with geometric lattice pattern; by Majiayao culture; 2600–2300 BC; painted potter; Shanghai Museum

=== Jade culture ===
The Liangzhu culture was the last Neolithic Jade culture in the Yangtze River Delta and was spaced over a period of about 1,300 years. The Jade from this culture is characterized by finely worked, large ritual jades such as Cong cylinders, Bi discs, Yue axes and also pendants and decorations in the form of chiseled open-work plaques, plates and representations of small birds, turtles and fish. The Liangzhu Jade has a white, milky bone-like aspect due to its tremolite rock origin and influence of water-based fluids at the burial sites.

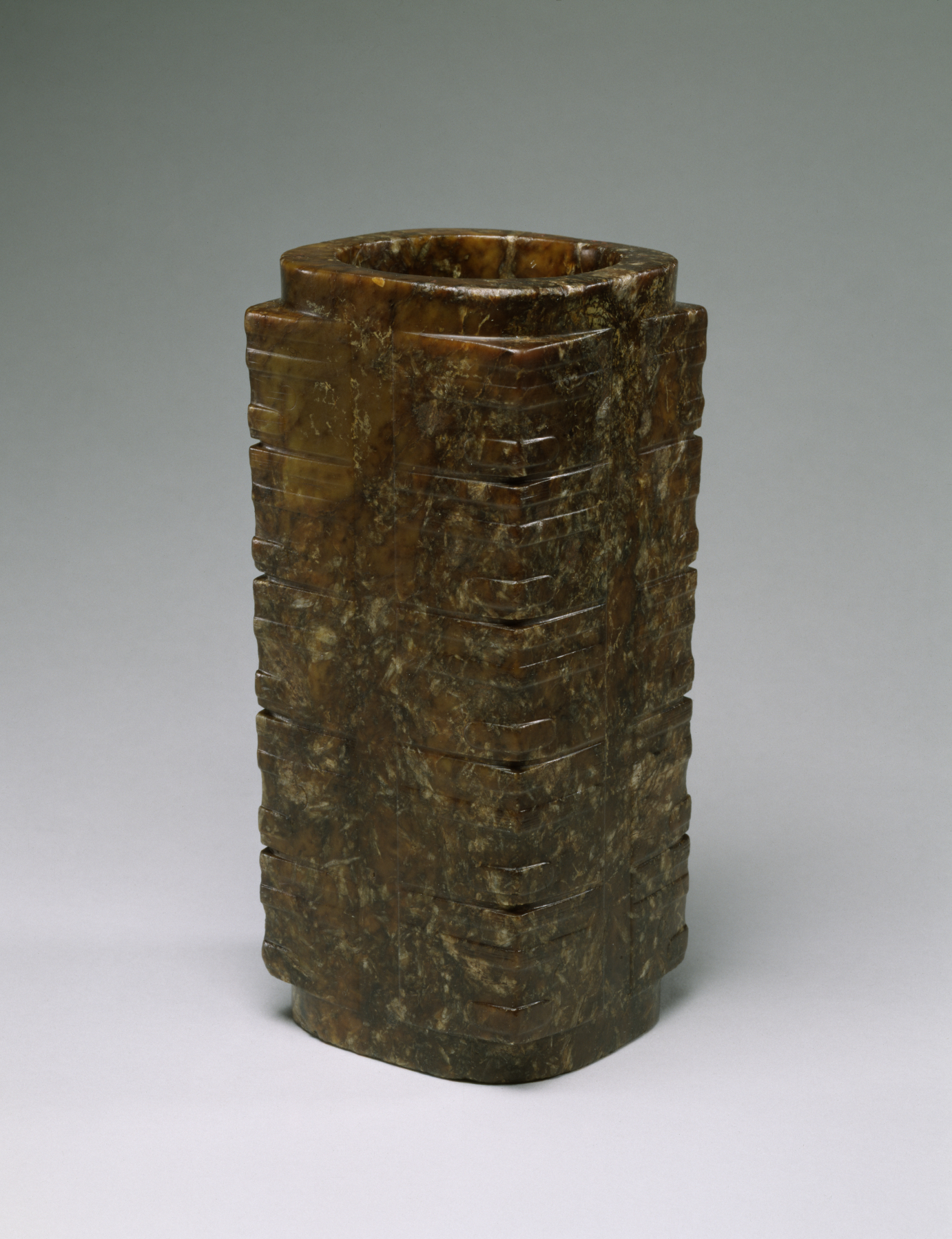
Cong, 3rd millennium BCE

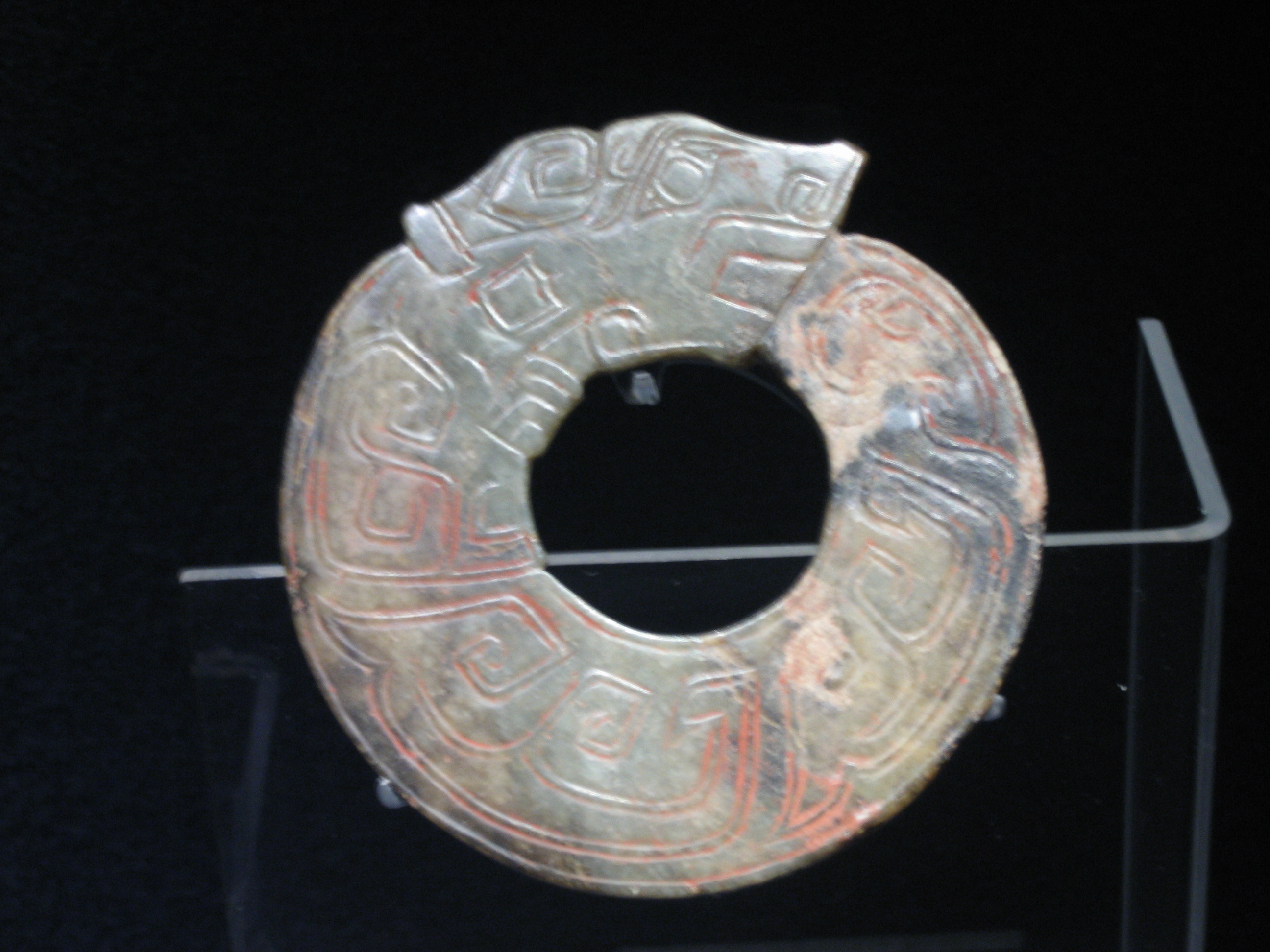
Two-dragon ring, early Shang dynasty (2nd millennium BCE)

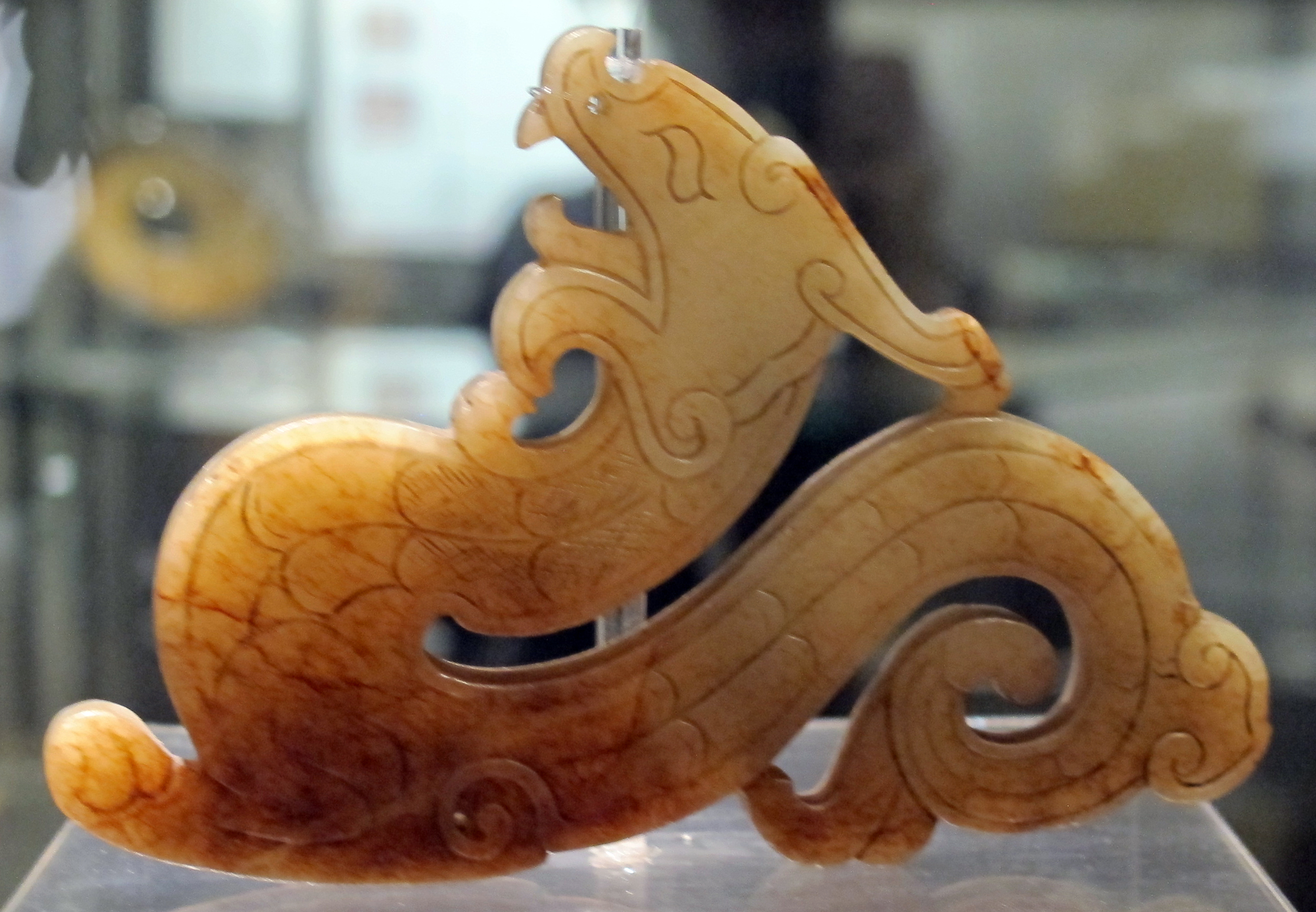
Jade dragon, Western Zhou

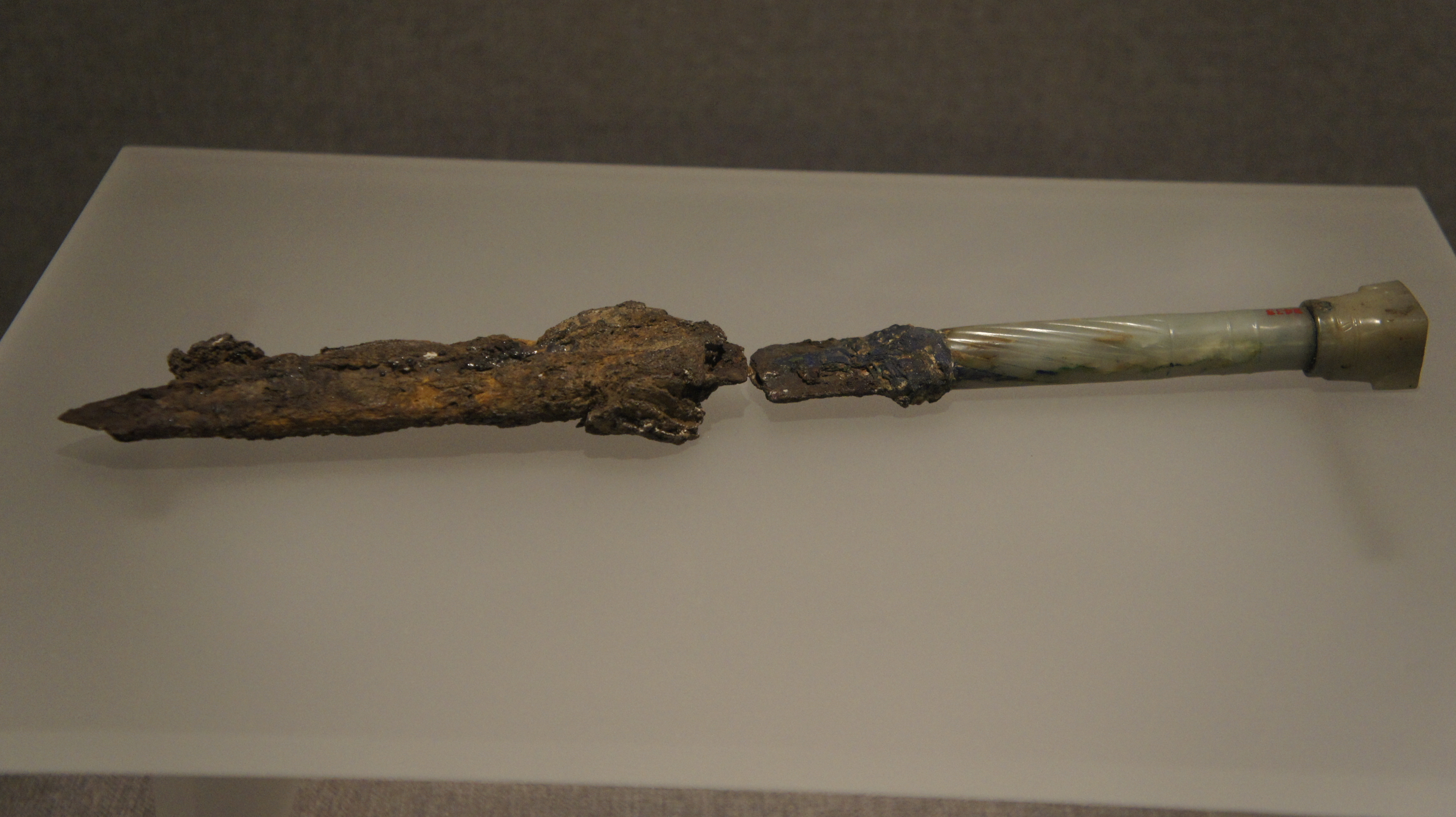
Rusted Zhou-era Jian with a jade hilt, c.9th century BCE

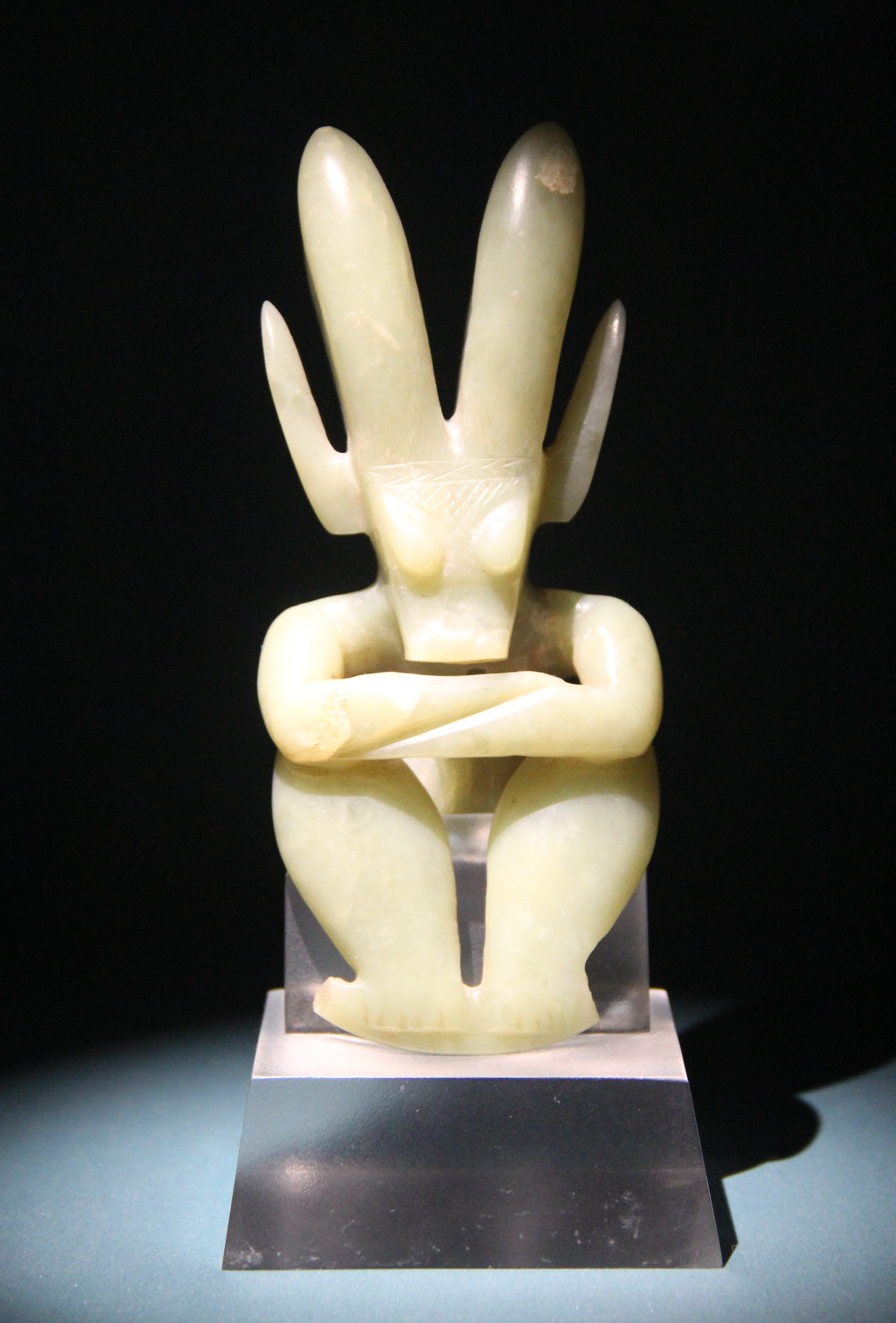
Jade humanoid, Hongshan culture (4700–2900 BCE).

=== Bronze casting ===
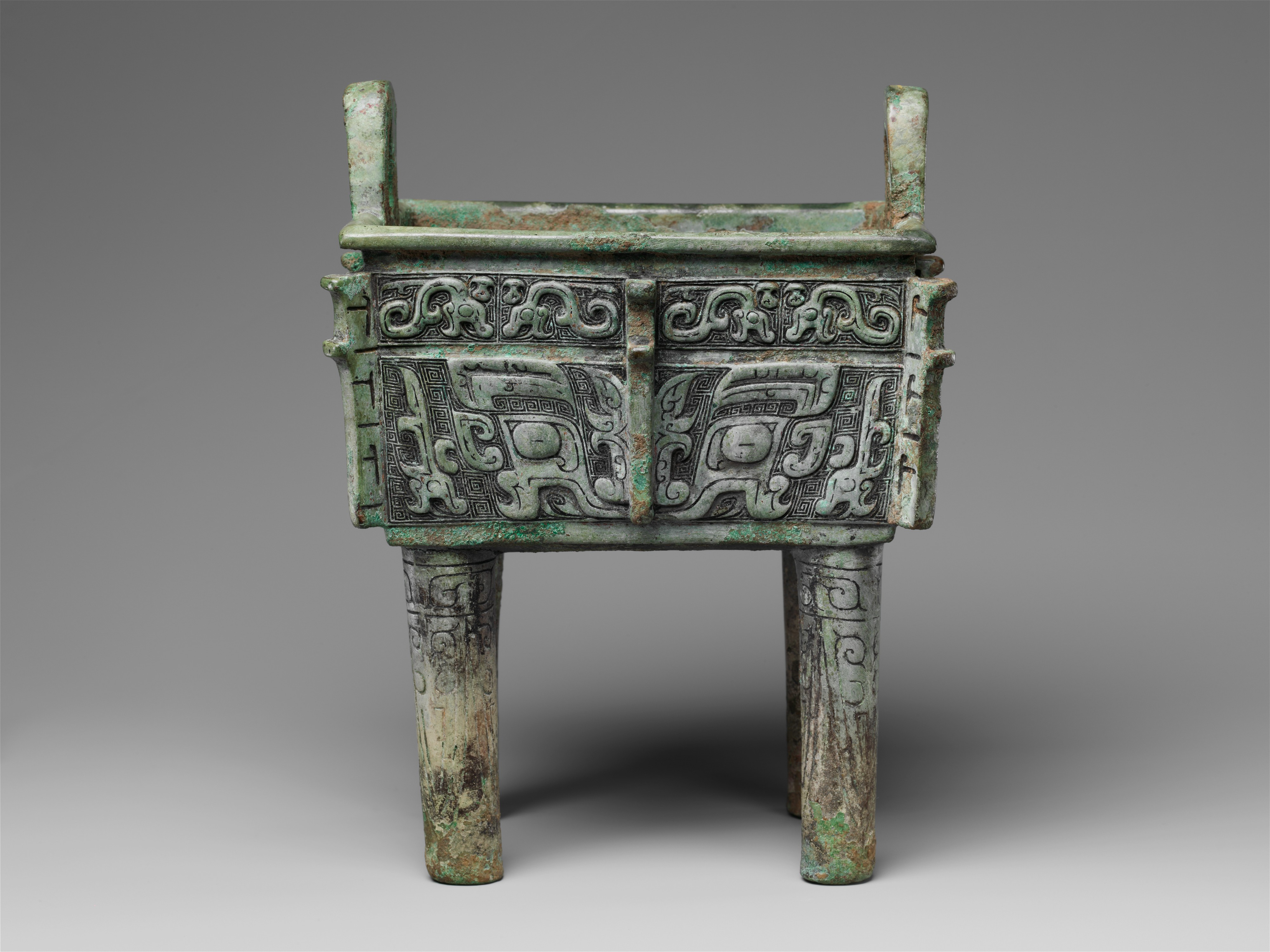
Rectangular cauldron (fangding); 12th–11th century BC; bronze; height: 22.9 cm, width: 15.2 cm, depth: 17.8 cm; Metropolitan Museum of Art (New York City)

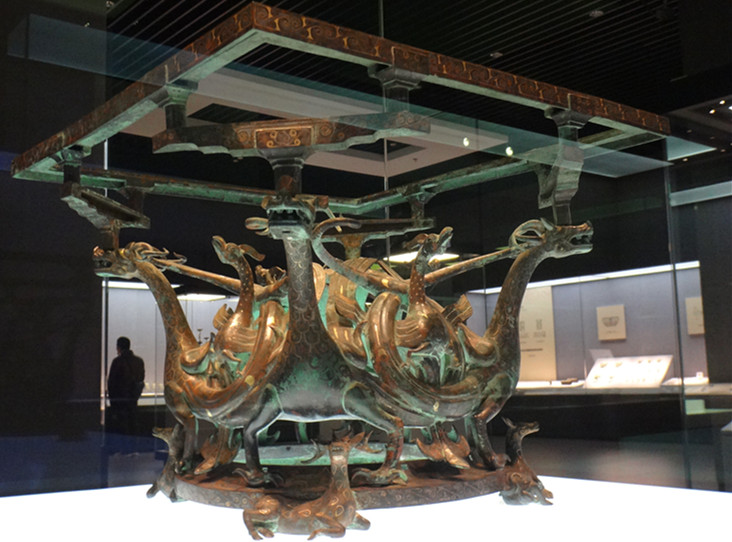
Bronze square table supported by dragons and phoenix, Warring States

The Bronze Age in China began with the Xia dynasty. Examples from this period have been recovered from ruins of the Erlitou culture, in Shanxi, and include complex but unadorned utilitarian objects. In the following Shang dynasty more elaborate objects, including many ritual vessels, were crafted. The Shang are remembered for their bronze casting, noted for its clarity of detail. Shang bronzesmiths usually worked in foundries outside the cities to make ritual vessels, and sometimes weapons and chariot fittings as well. The bronze vessels were receptacles for storing or serving various solids and liquids used in the performance of sacred ceremonies. Some forms such as the ku and jue can be very graceful, but the most powerful pieces are the ding, sometimes described as having an "air of ferocious majesty".

It is typical of the developed Shang style that all available space is decorated, most often with stylized forms of real and imaginary animals. The most common motif is the taotie, which shows a mythological being presented frontally as though squashed onto a horizontal plane to form a symmetrical design. The early significance of taotie is not clear, but myths about it existed around the late Zhou dynasty. It was considered to be variously a covetous man banished to guard a corner of heaven against evil monsters; or a monster equipped with only a head which tries to devour men but hurts only itself.

The function and appearance of bronzes changed gradually from the Shang to the Zhou. They shifted from being used in religious rites to more practical purposes. By the Warring States period, bronze vessels had become objects of aesthetic enjoyment. Some were decorated with social scenes, such as from a banquet or hunt; whilst others displayed abstract patterns inlaid with gold, silver, or precious and semiprecious stones.

Bronze artifacts also have significant meaning and roles in the Han dynasty as well. People used them for funerary purposes which reflect the aesthetic and artistic qualities of the Han dynasty. Many bronze vessels excavated from tombs in Jiangsu Province, China, have various shapes like Ding, Hu, and Xun which represent traditional Chinese aesthete. These vessels are classical representations of Chinese celestial art forms which play a great role in ancient Chinese's communication with spirits of their ancestors. Other than the vessels, bronze weapons, daily items, and musical instruments are also found in royal Han families' tomb in Jiangsu. Being able to put a full set of Bianzhong in ones tomb signifies his or her status and class in the Han dynasty since this particular type of instrument is only acquired and owned by royal and wealth families. Apparently, Bianzhong and music are also used as a path for the Han rulers to communication with their Gods. The excavation of Bianzhong, a typical and royal instrument found in ancient China, emphasizes the development of complex music systems in the Han dynasty. The set of Bianzhong can vary in many cases; for example, a specific excavation of Bianzhong from Jiangsu Province include different sets of bells, like Niuzhong and Yongzhong bells, and many of them appear in animal forms like the dragon, a traditional Chinese spiritual animal.

Shang bronzes became appreciated as works of art from the Song dynasty, when they were collected and prized not only for their shape and design but also for the various green, blue green, and even reddish patinas created by chemical action as they lay buried in the ground. The study of early Chinese bronze casting is a specialized field of art history.

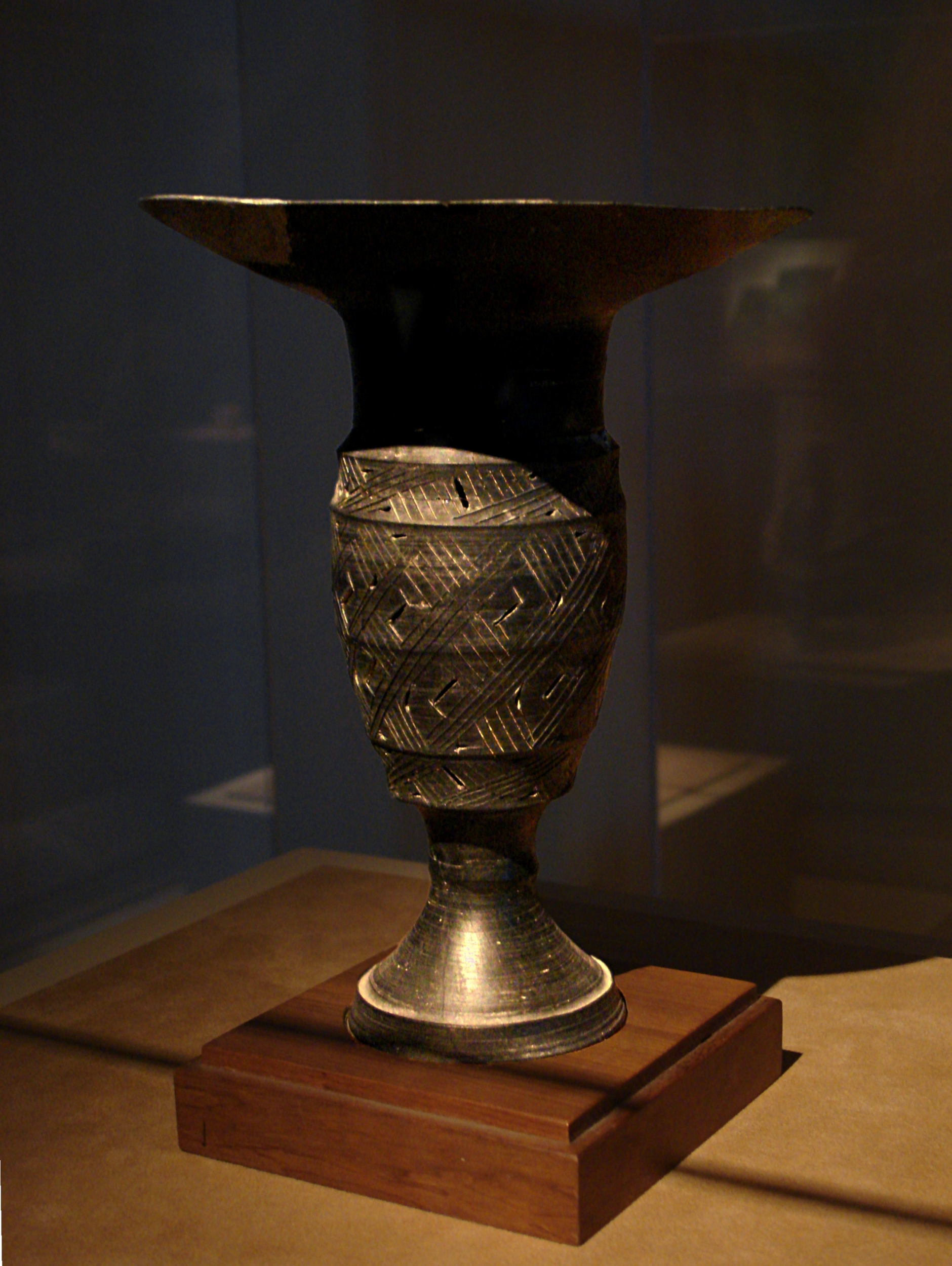
Longshan goblet; circa 2500–2000 BC; Excavated at Jiaoxian in Shandong, 1975)

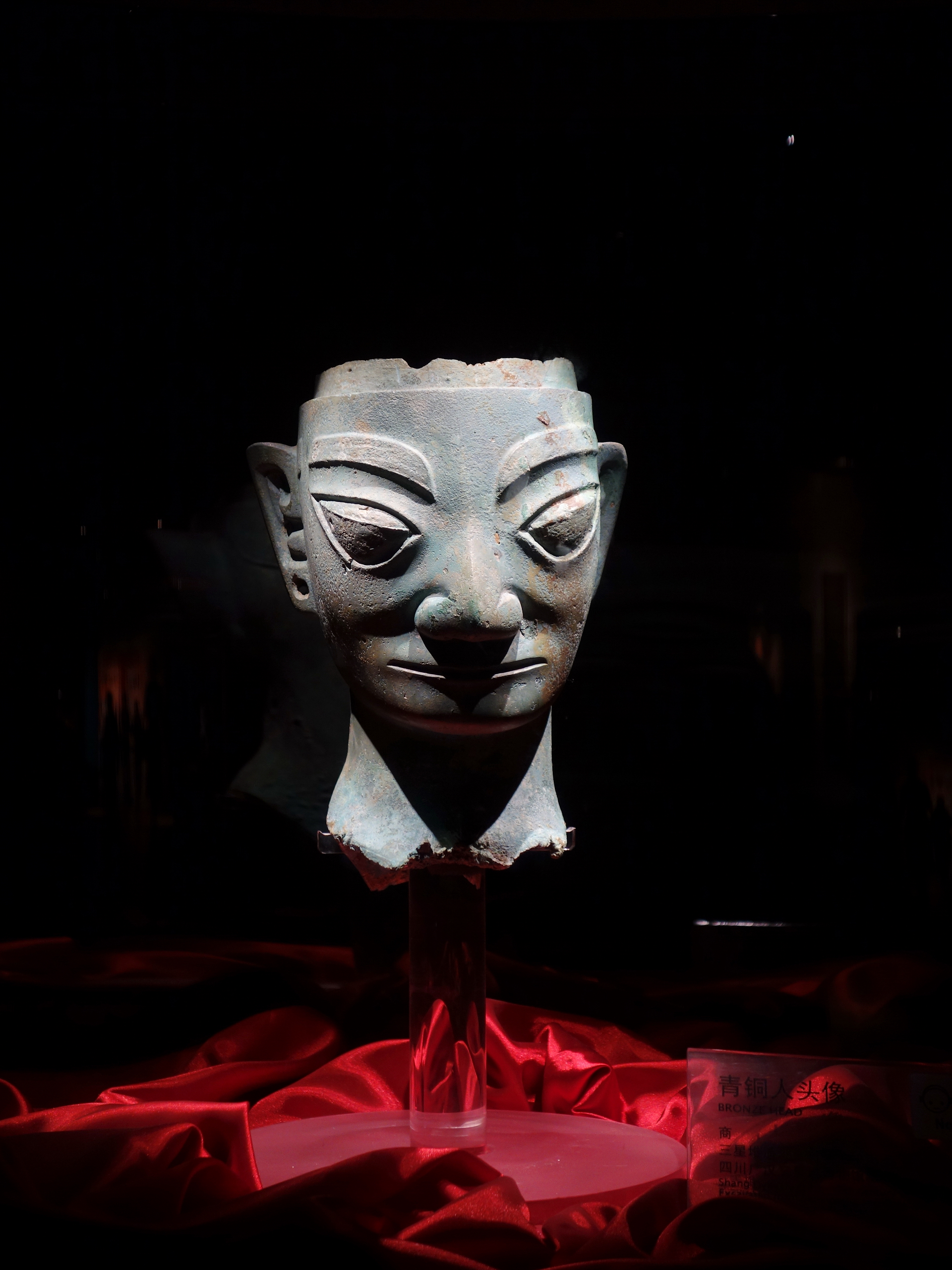
Sanxingdui bronze head, 2nd millennium BCE

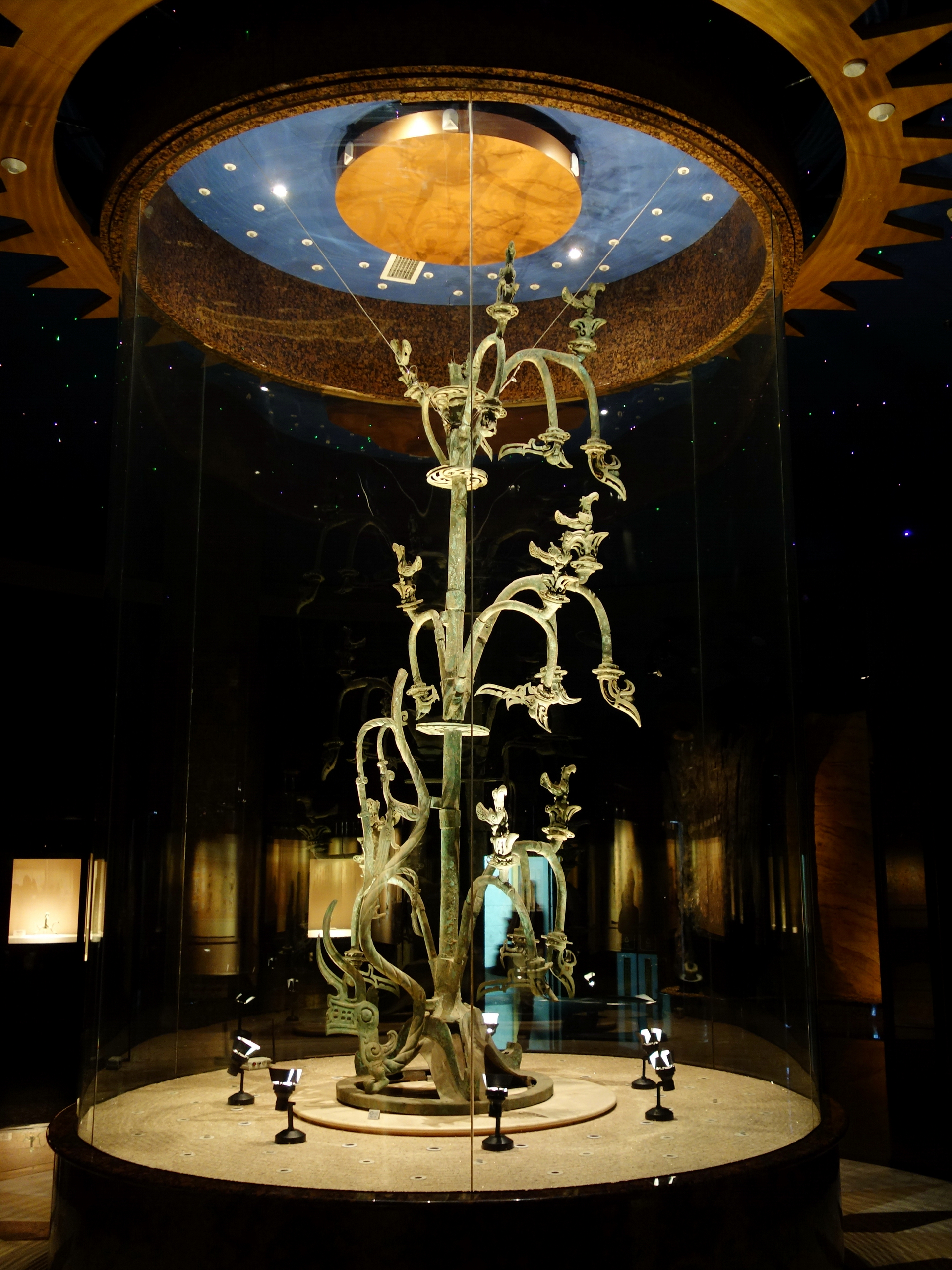
Sacred bronze tree, Sanxingdui

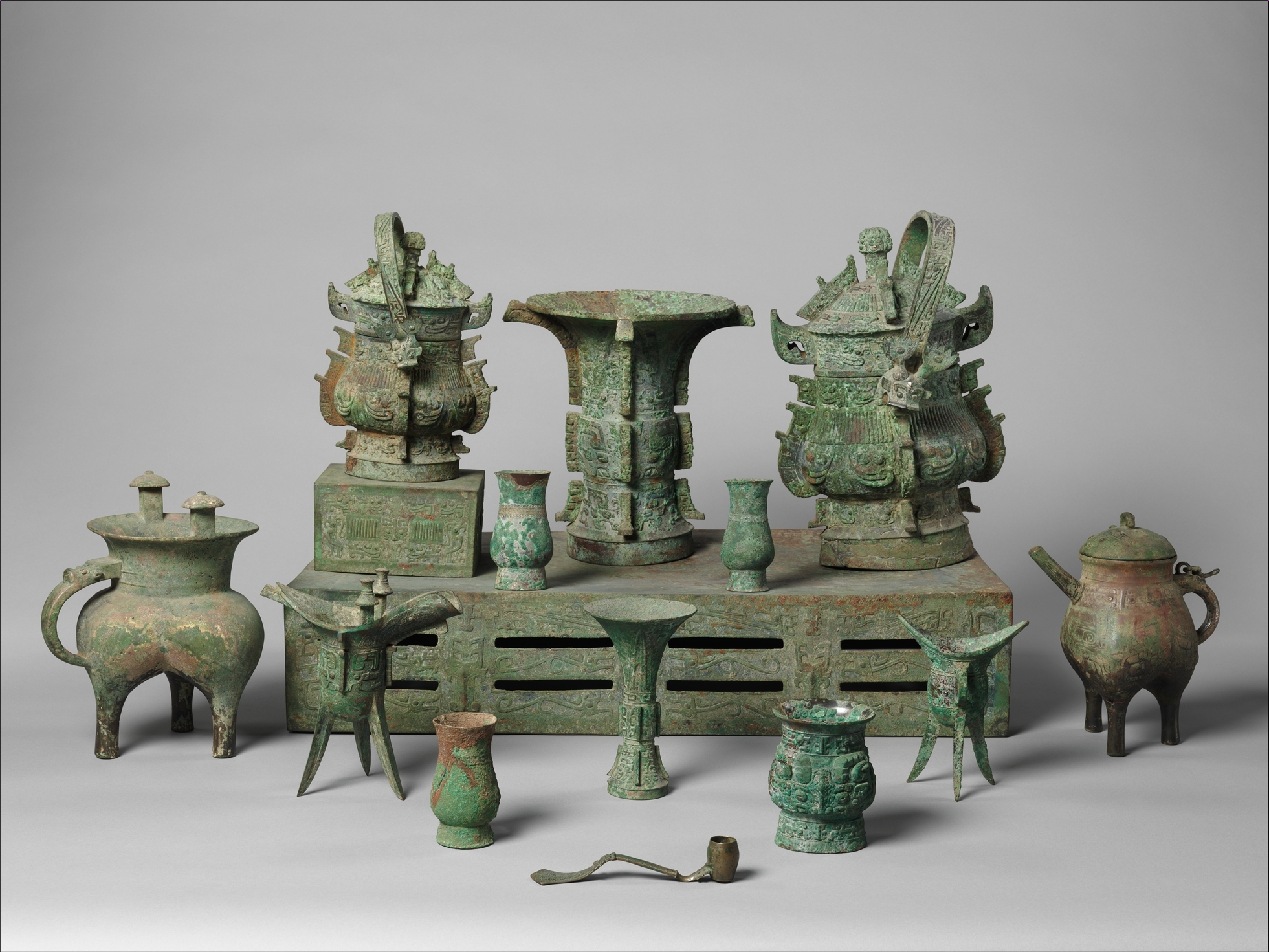
Altar set; late 11th century BC; bronze; overall (table): height: 18.1 cm (7 1/8 in.), width: 46.4 cm (18 1/4 in.), depth: 89.9 cm (35 3/8 in.); Metropolitan Museum of Art (New York City, U.S.)

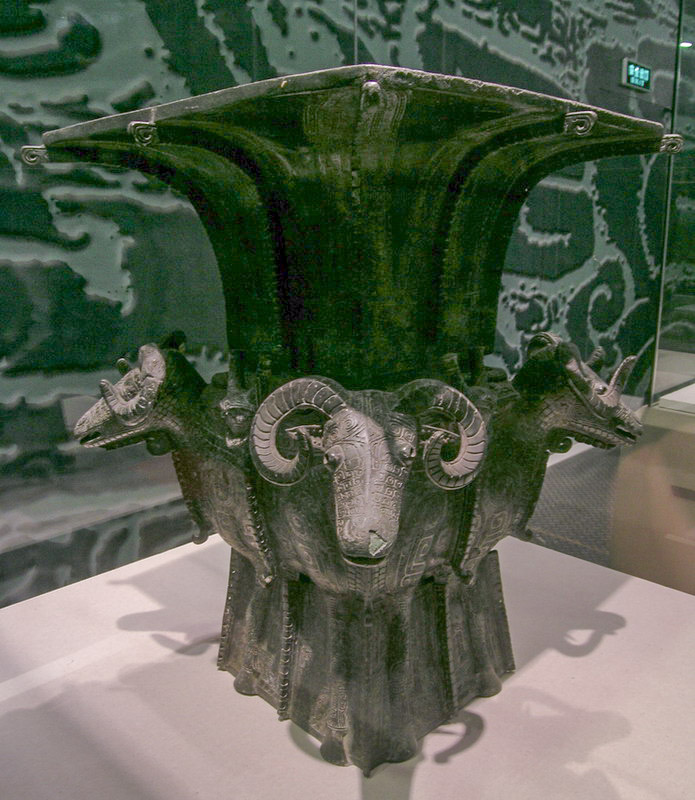
Square zun with four sheep-head ornaments, Shang dynasty

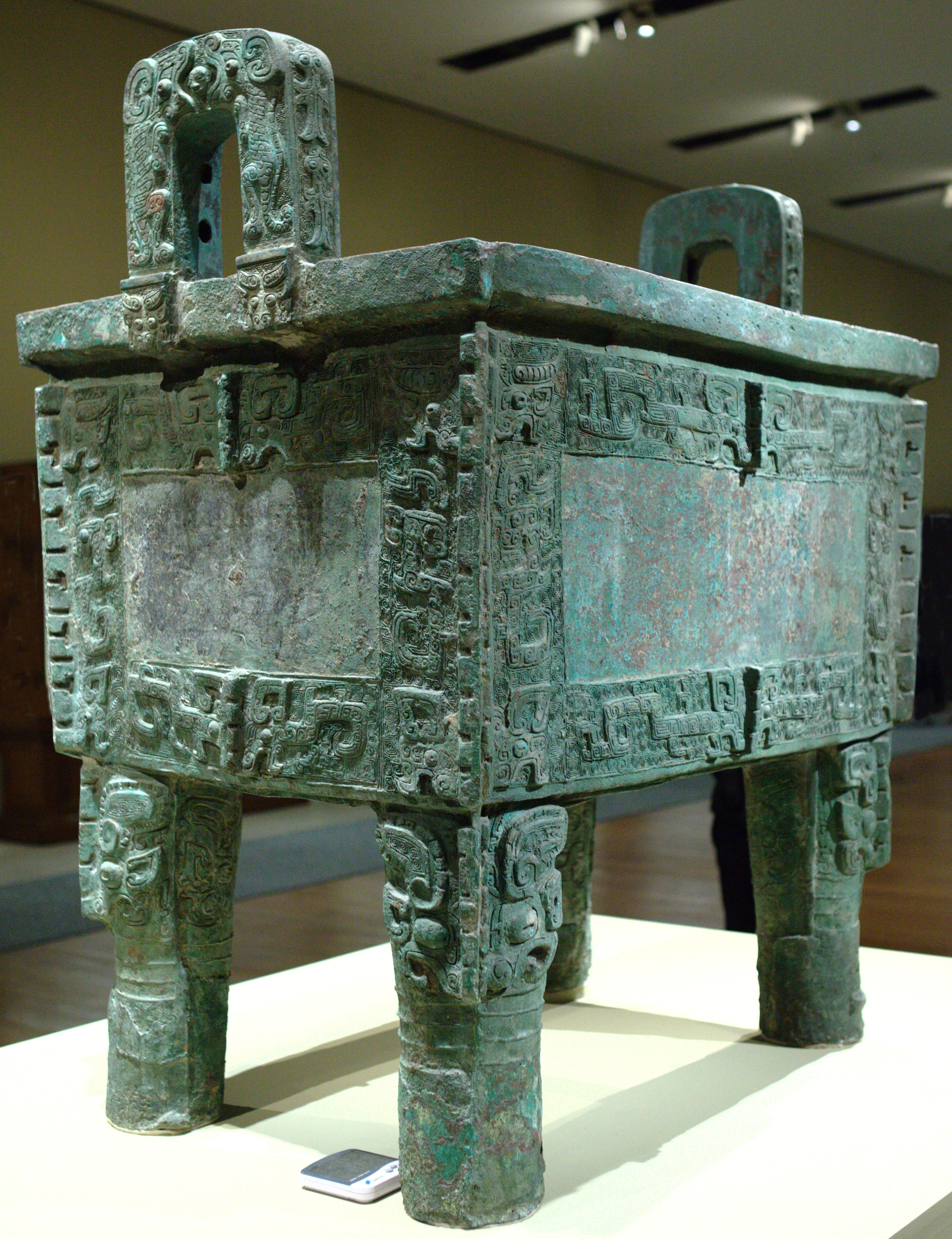
Houmuwu ding, the largest ancient bronze ever found; 1300–1046 BCE; National Museum of China.

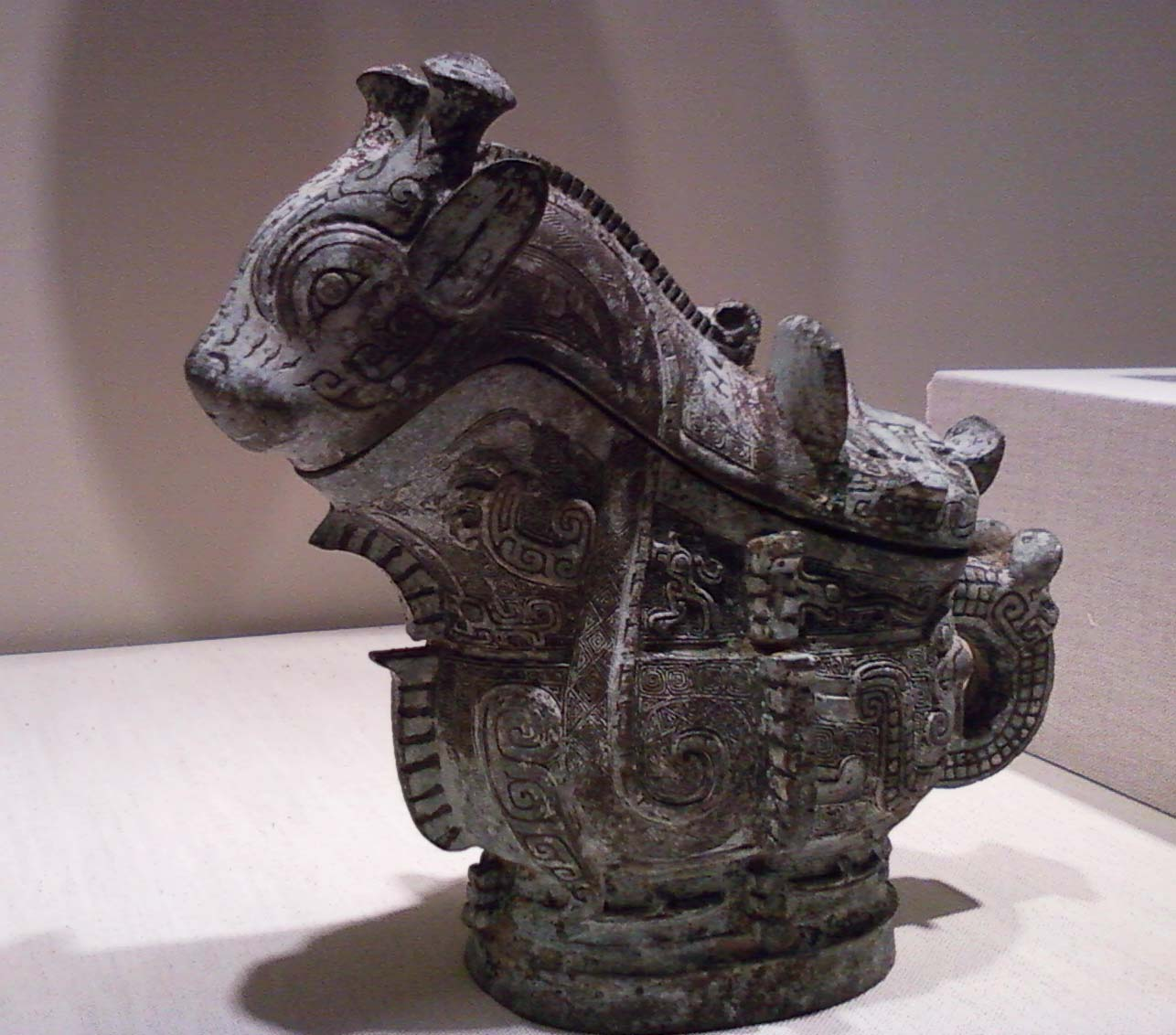
Ritual wine server (guang); 1100 BC; Indianapolis Museum of Art.

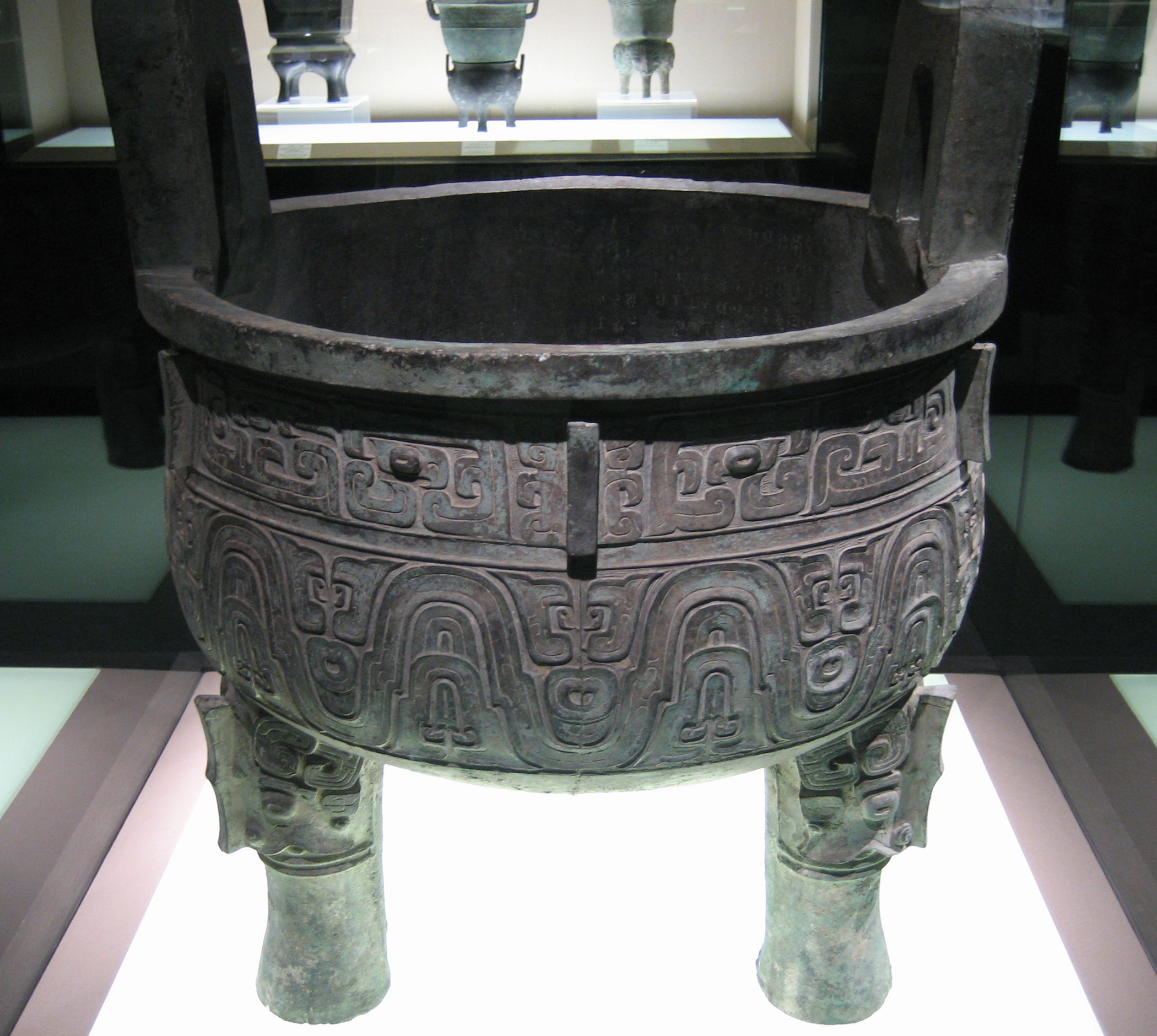
Da Ke ding; Western Zhou dynasty; height: 93.1 cm (36.7 in), width: 75.6 cm (29.8 in) (bore) & 74.9 cm (29.5 in) (inside diameter); discovered in 1890, at Famen Town (Fufeng County, Shaanxi); Shanghai Museum

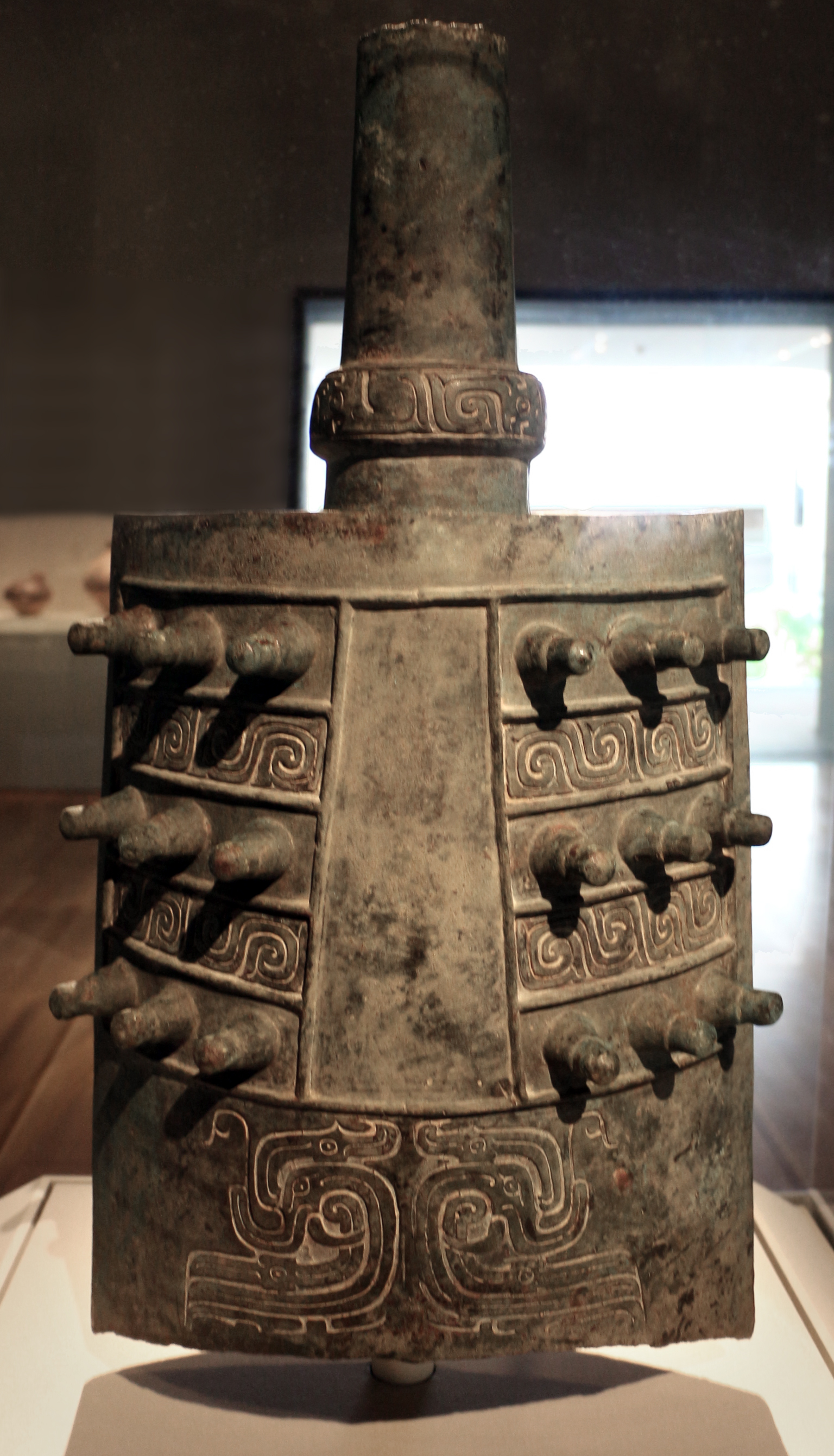
Bell (lai zhong); 800–700 BC (Western Zhou dynasty); 70.3 × 37 × 26.6 cm (27 5/8 × 14 9/16 × 10 7/16 in.); from Meixian, Shaanxi); Cleveland Museum of Art. In ancient China music and ritual had political significance and were linked inseparably to the power of states

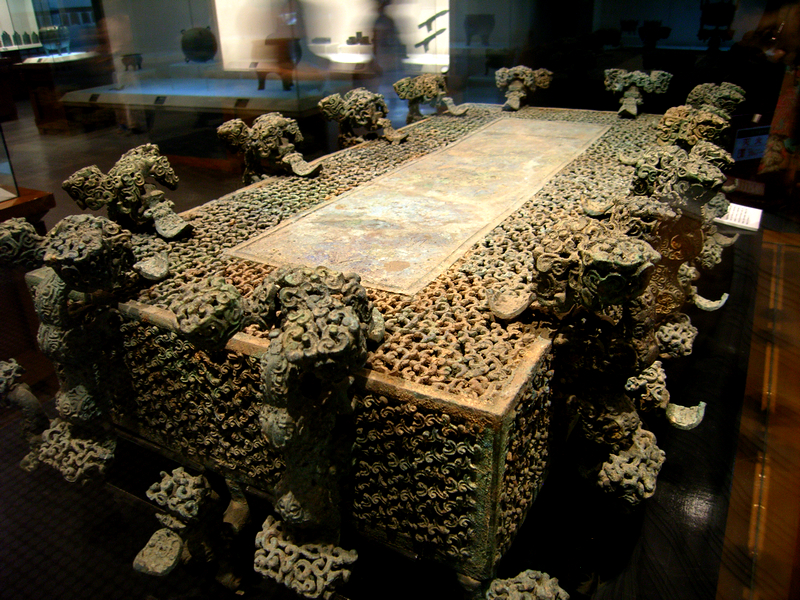
A bronze stand for ceremonial vessels; excavated from the tomb of the son of King Zhuang of Chu (r. 613–591 BCE)

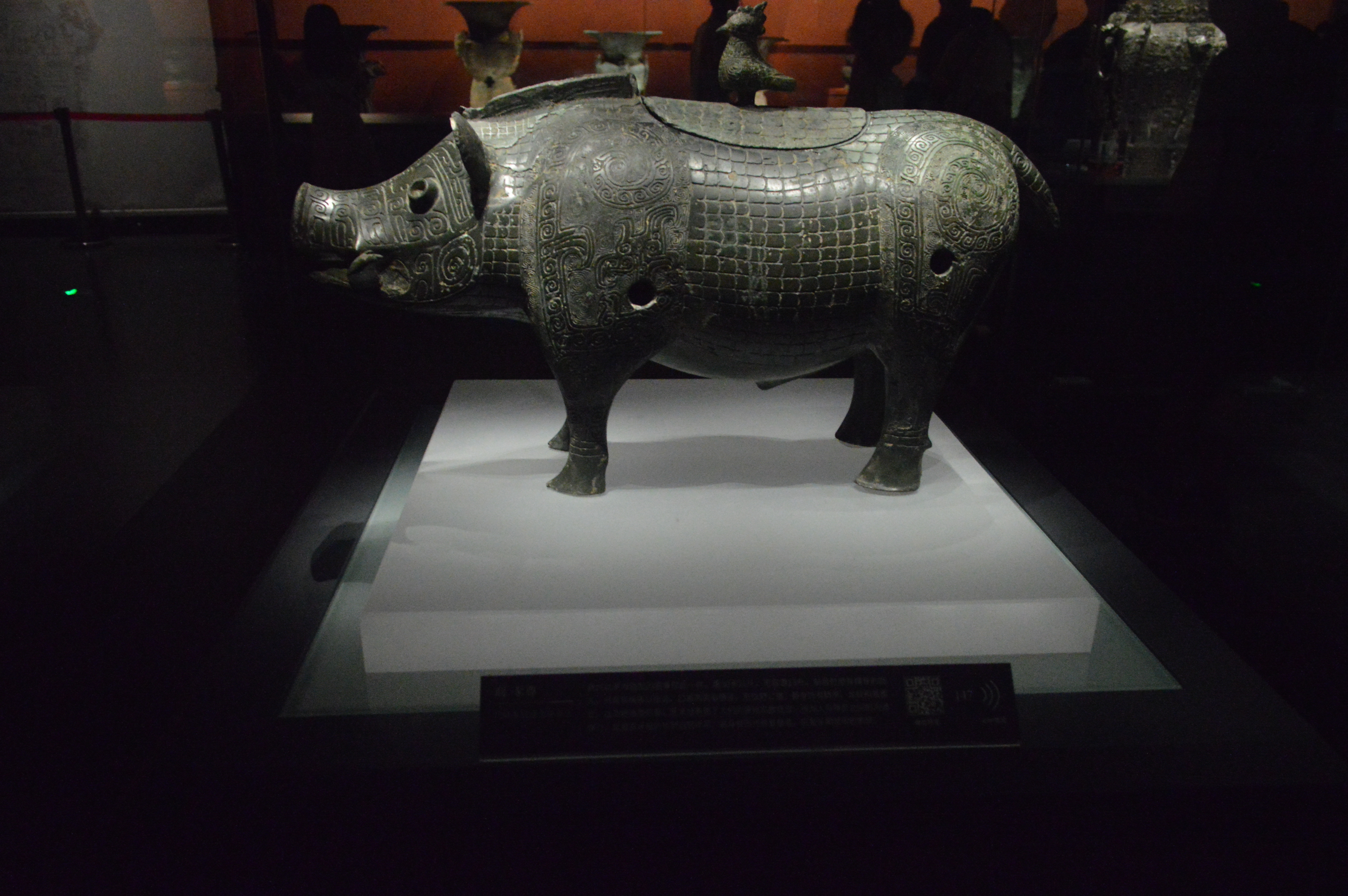
Shi zun; 1600–1046 BC; height: 40 cm (16 in); discovered at Chuanxingshan (Xiangtan County, Hunan); Hunan Museum

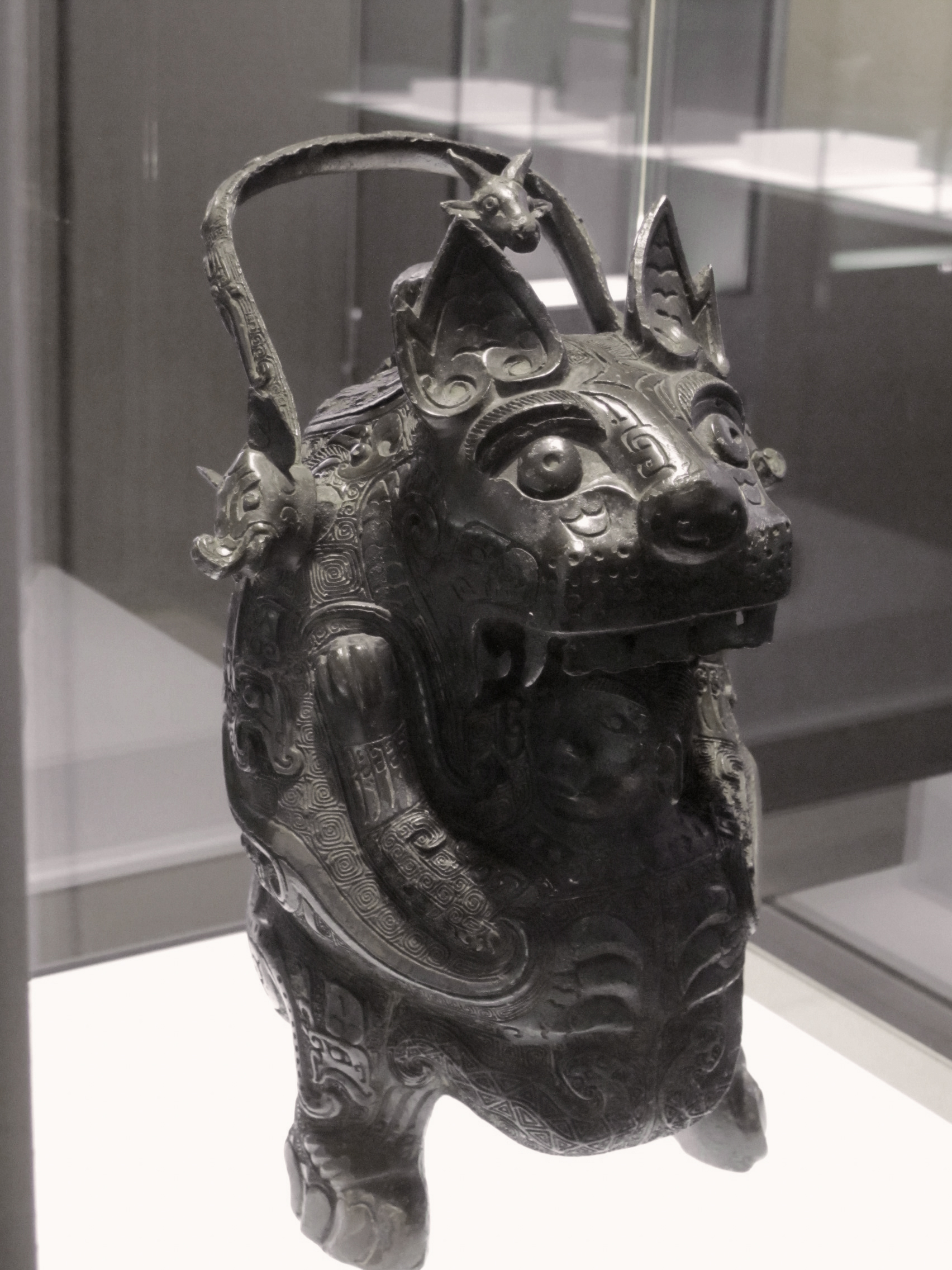
Shang bronze vessel, 2nd millennium BC

=== Zhou dynasty (c. 1046 – 256 BCE) ===
During the Zhou period, few sculptures, especially sculptures of human or animal form, are recorded in the extant archaeology, and there does not appear to have been much of a sculptural tradition. Among the very few such depictions known in China before that date: four wooden figurines from Liangdaicun (梁帶村) in Hancheng (韓城), Shaanxi, possibly dating to the 9th century BCE; two wooden human figurines of foreigners possibly representing sedan chair bearers from a Qin state tomb in Longxian (隴縣), Shaanxi, from about 700 BCE; and more numerous statuettes from around 5th century bronze musicians in a miniature house from Shaoxing (紹興) in Zhejiang; a 4th-century human-shaped lamp stand from Pingshan (平山) county royal tomb, Hebei. The Taerpo horserider is a Zhou-era Warrior-State Qin terracotta figurine from a tomb in the Taerpo cemetery (塔兒坡墓) near Xianyang in Shaanxi, dated to the 4th–3rd century BCE. Another nearly-identical statuette is known, from the same tomb. Small holes in his hands suggest that he was originally holding reins in one hand, and a weapon in the other. This is the earliest known representation of a cavalryman in China.

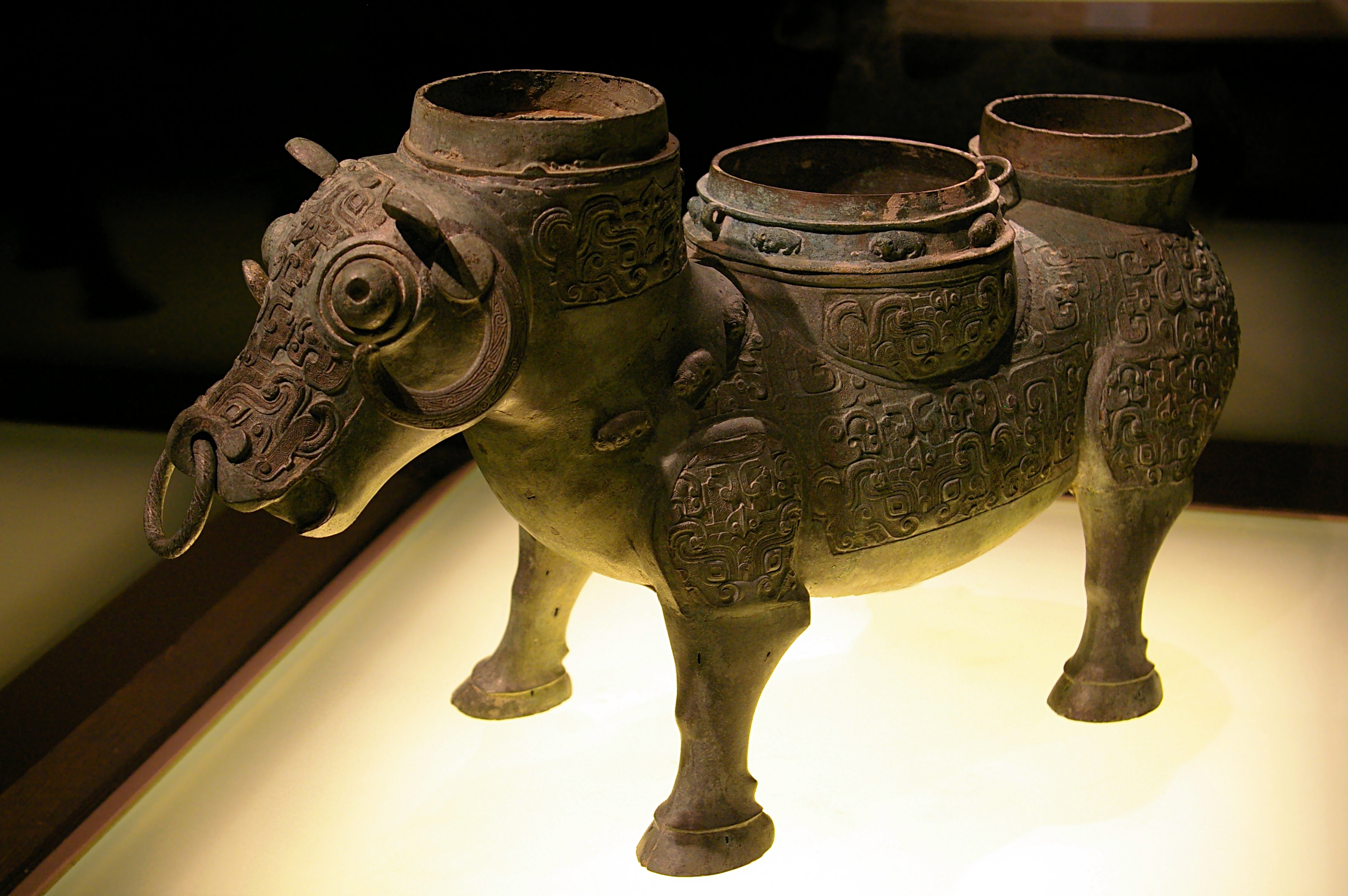
Spring and Autumn period ox-shaped vessel, 6th century BCE

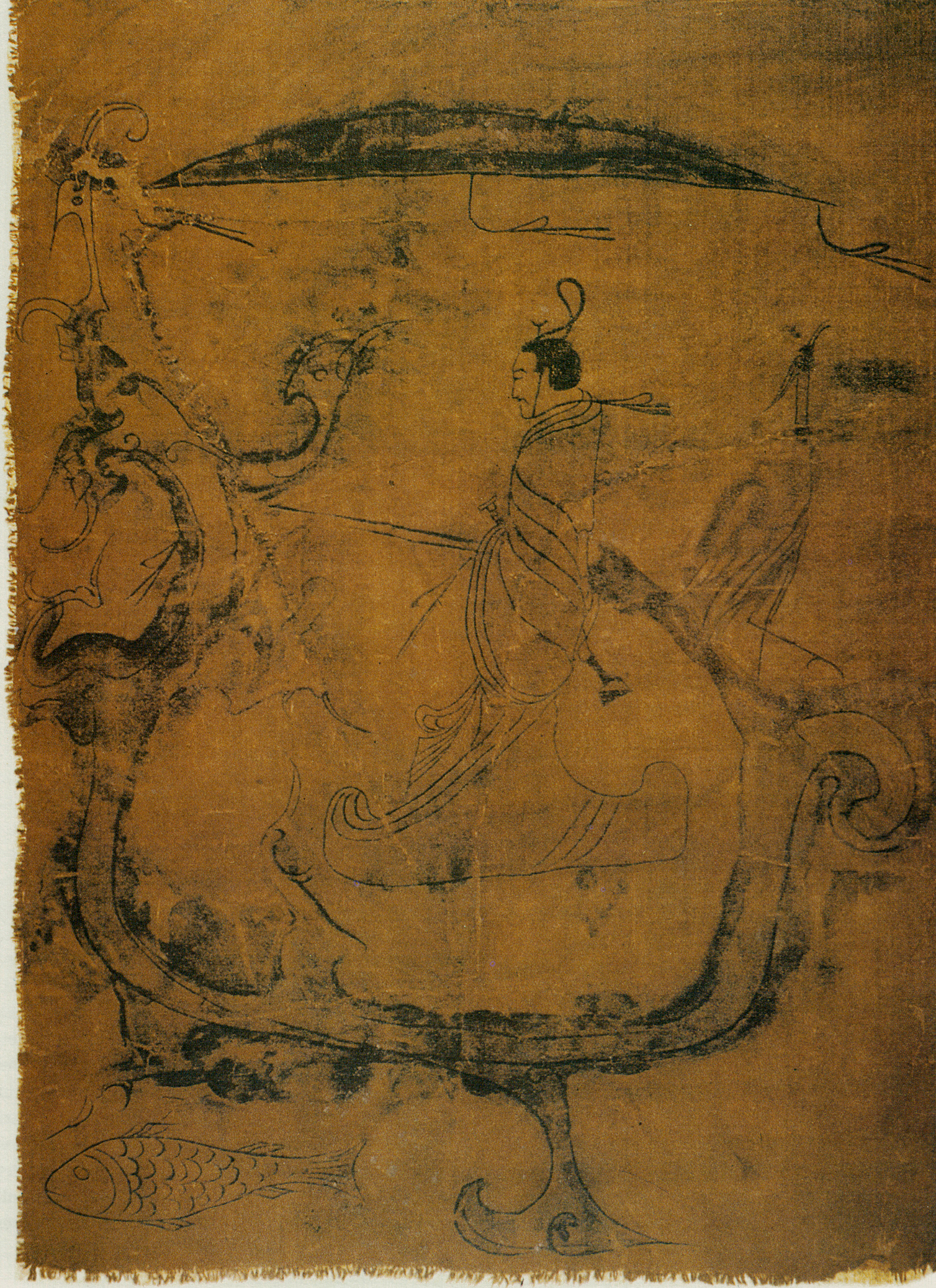
Silk painting depicting a man riding a dragon, 4th century BCE

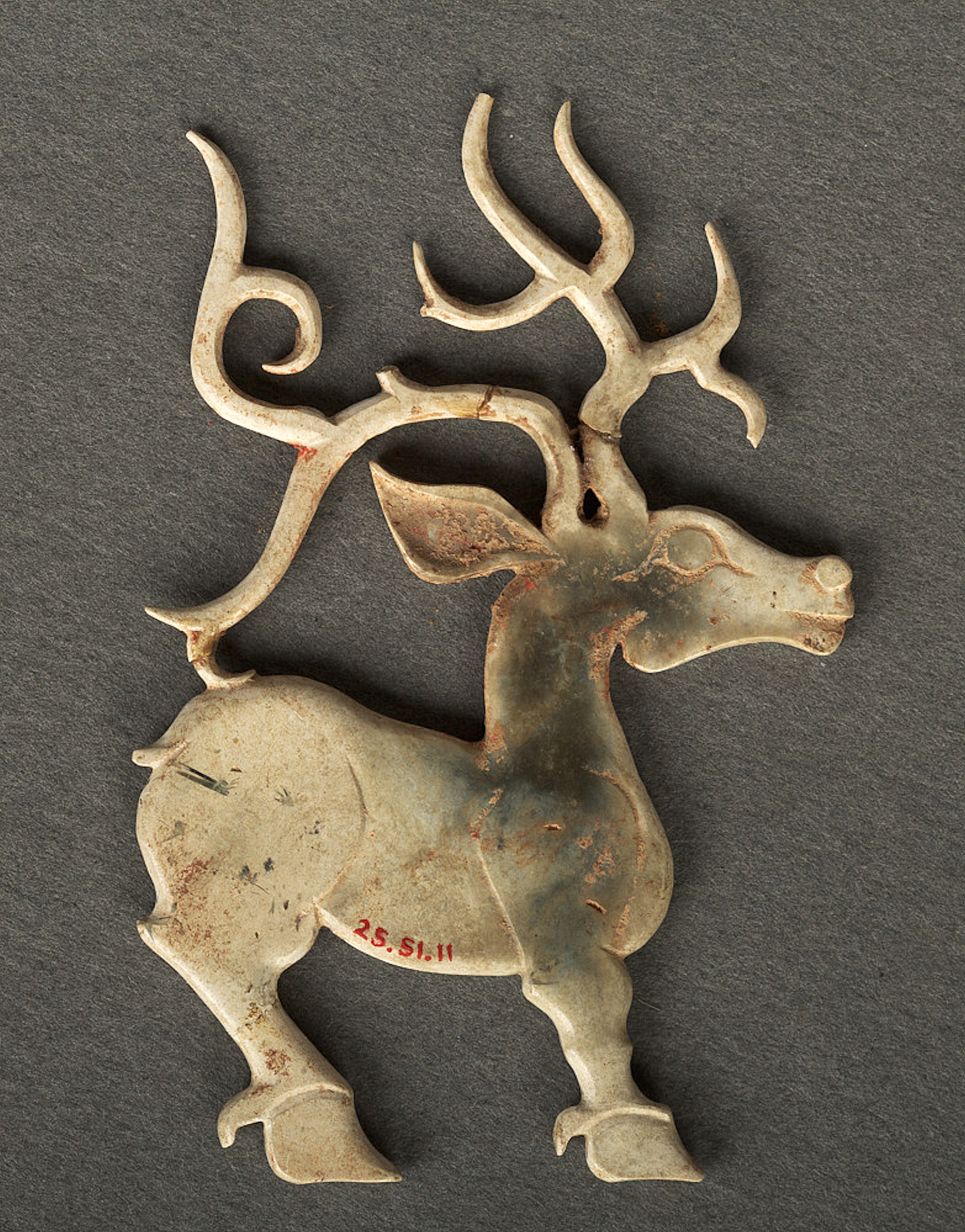
Western Zhou, 11-9th century BCE

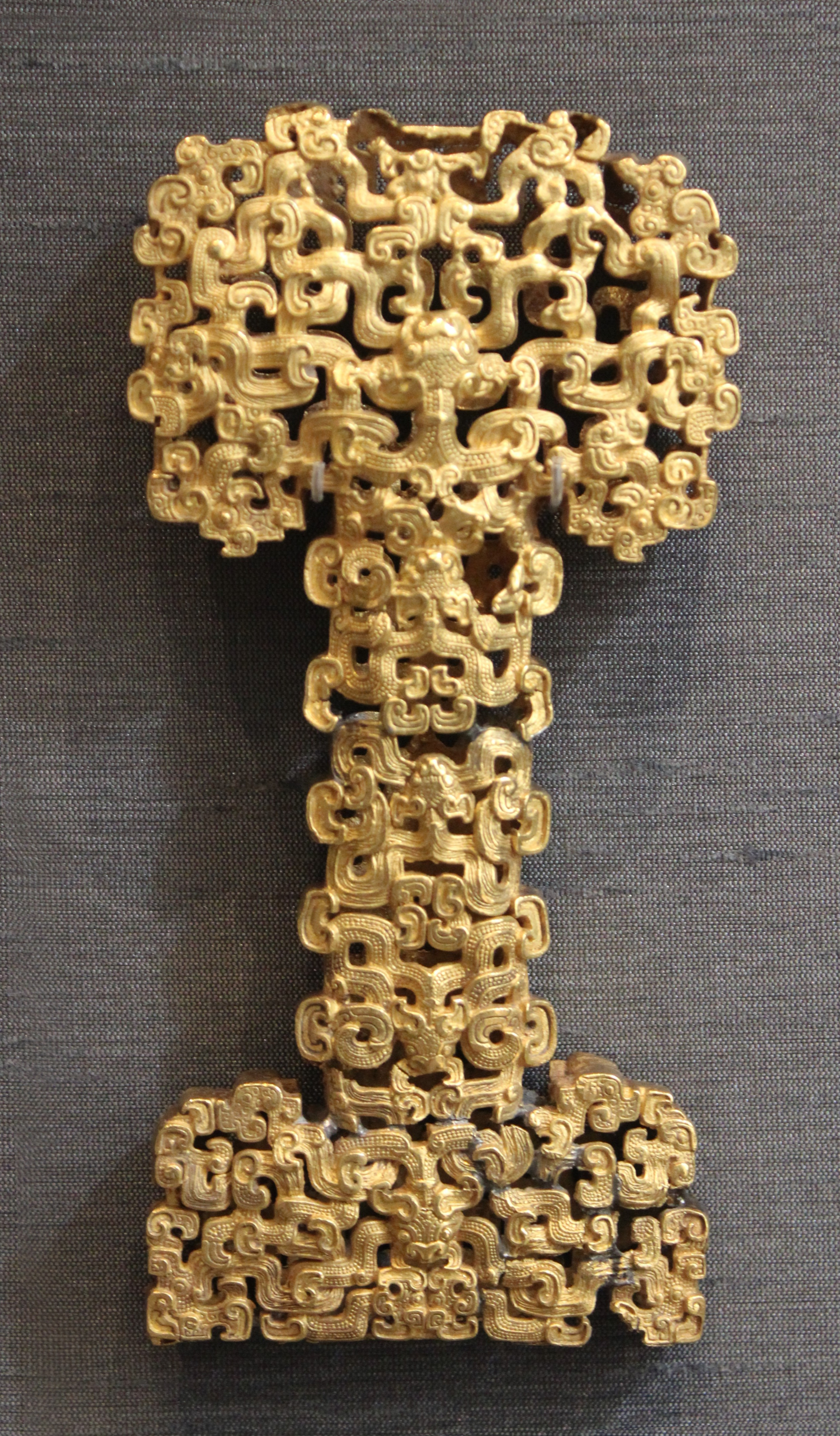
Gold sword hilt, Eastern Zhou

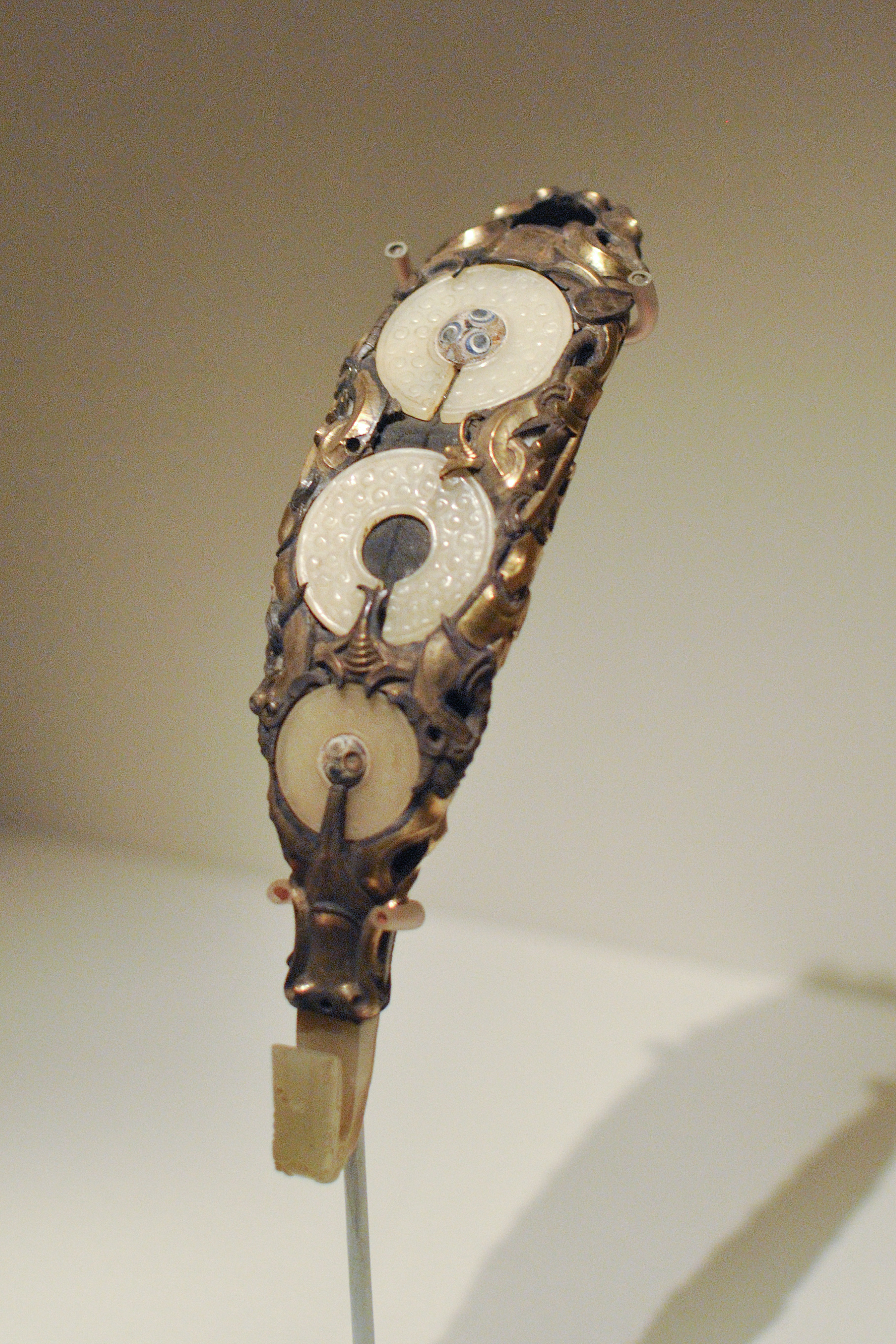
Silver belt buckle with inlaid gold and jade, Warring States, c. 4th century BCE

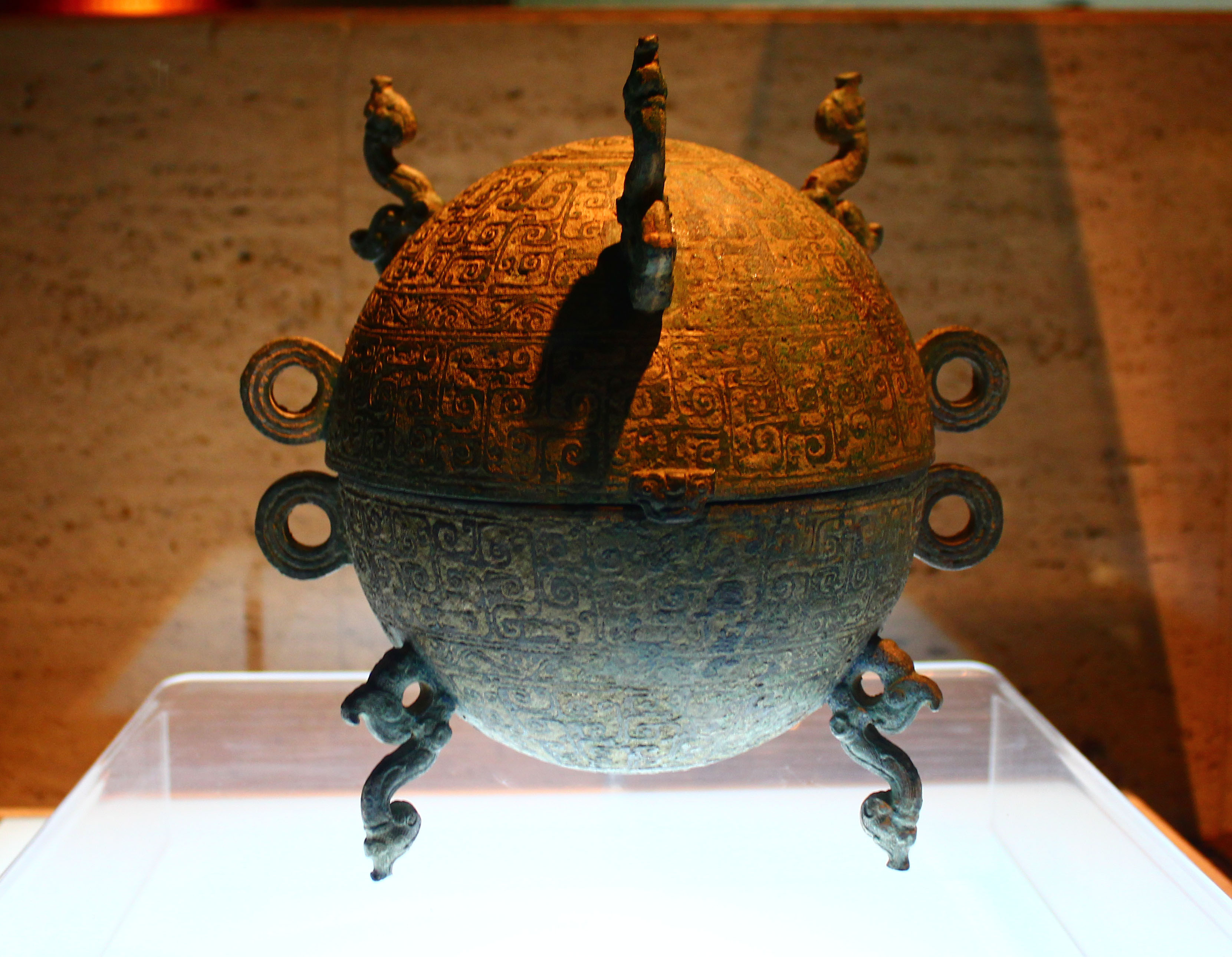
Bronze dui vessel with inlaid geometric cloud pattern, Eastern Zhou

==== Chu and Southern culture (c. 1030 BC – 223 BC) ====
A rich source of art in early China was the state of Chu, which developed in the Yangtze River valley. Excavations of Chu tombs have found painted wooden sculptures, jade disks, glass beads, musical instruments, and an assortment of lacquerware. Many of the lacquer objects are finely painted, red on black or black on red. A site in Changsha, Hunan province, has revealed some of the oldest paintings on silk discovered to date.

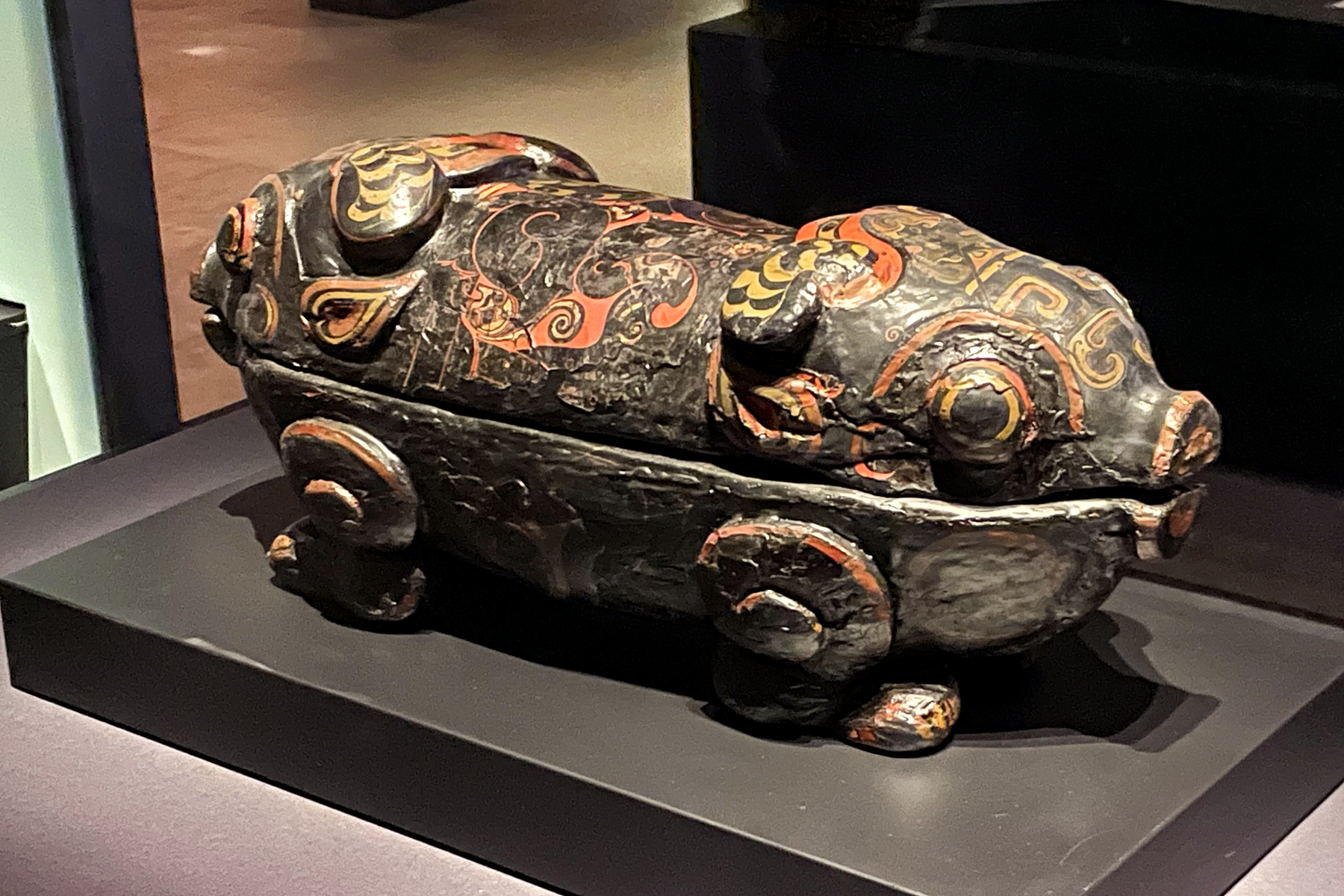
Painted lacquer box in the shape of 2 rear-to-rear pigs.

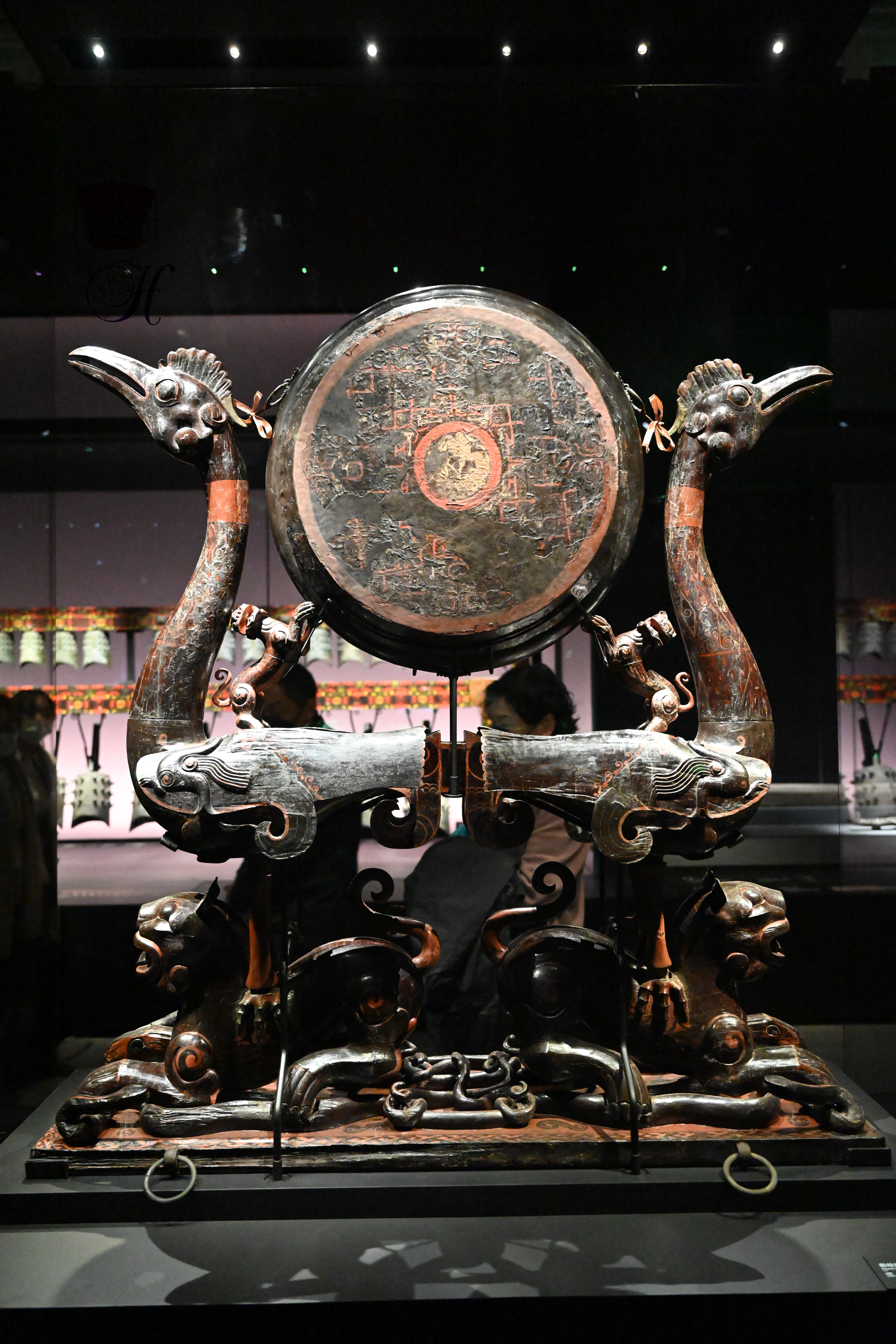
The Fenghuang was a popular motif in Chu art, whereas the dragon was more popular in the other states to its north.

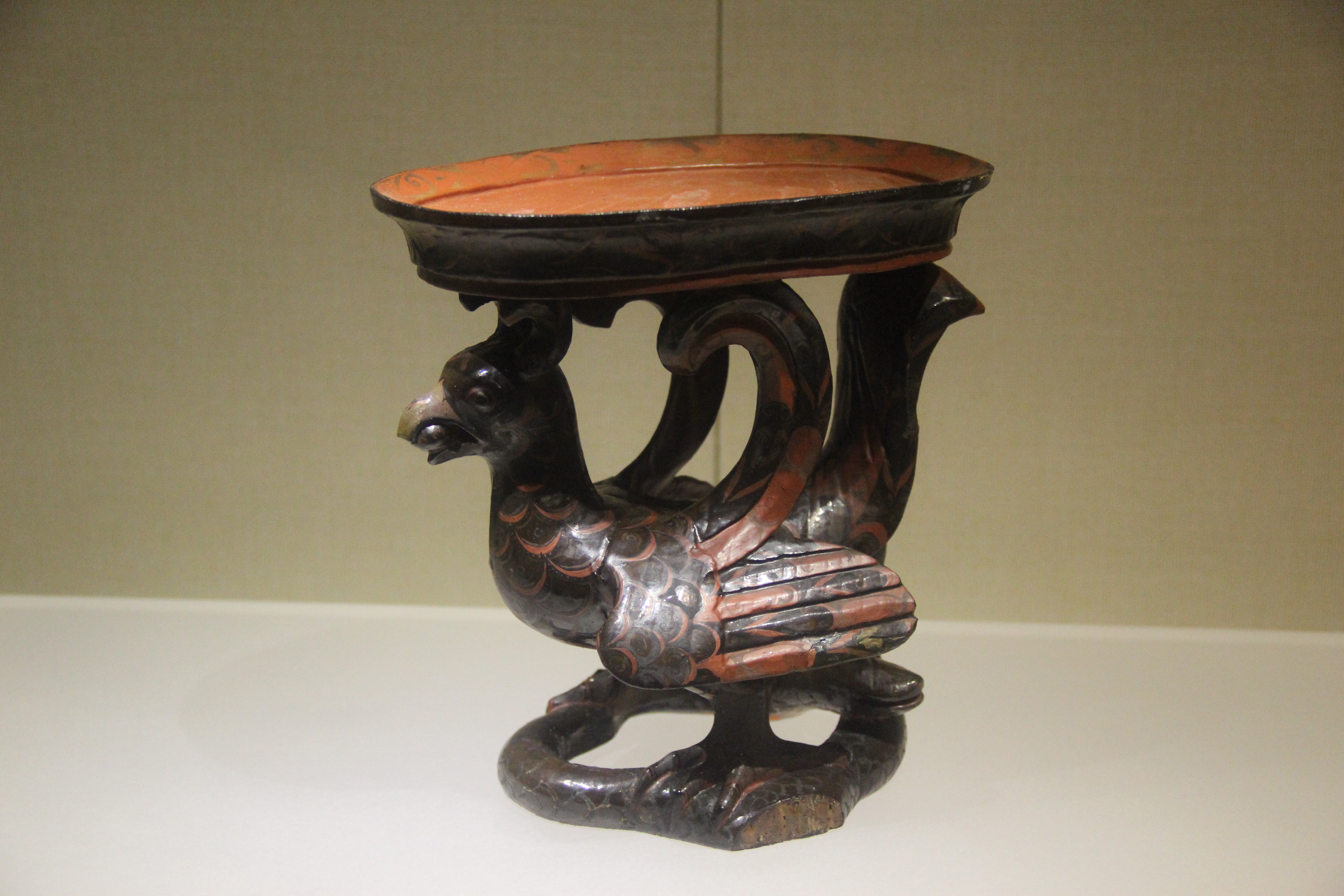
Lacquer dou with phoenix base.

=== Early imperial China (221 BCE – 220 CE) ===
==== Qin art ====
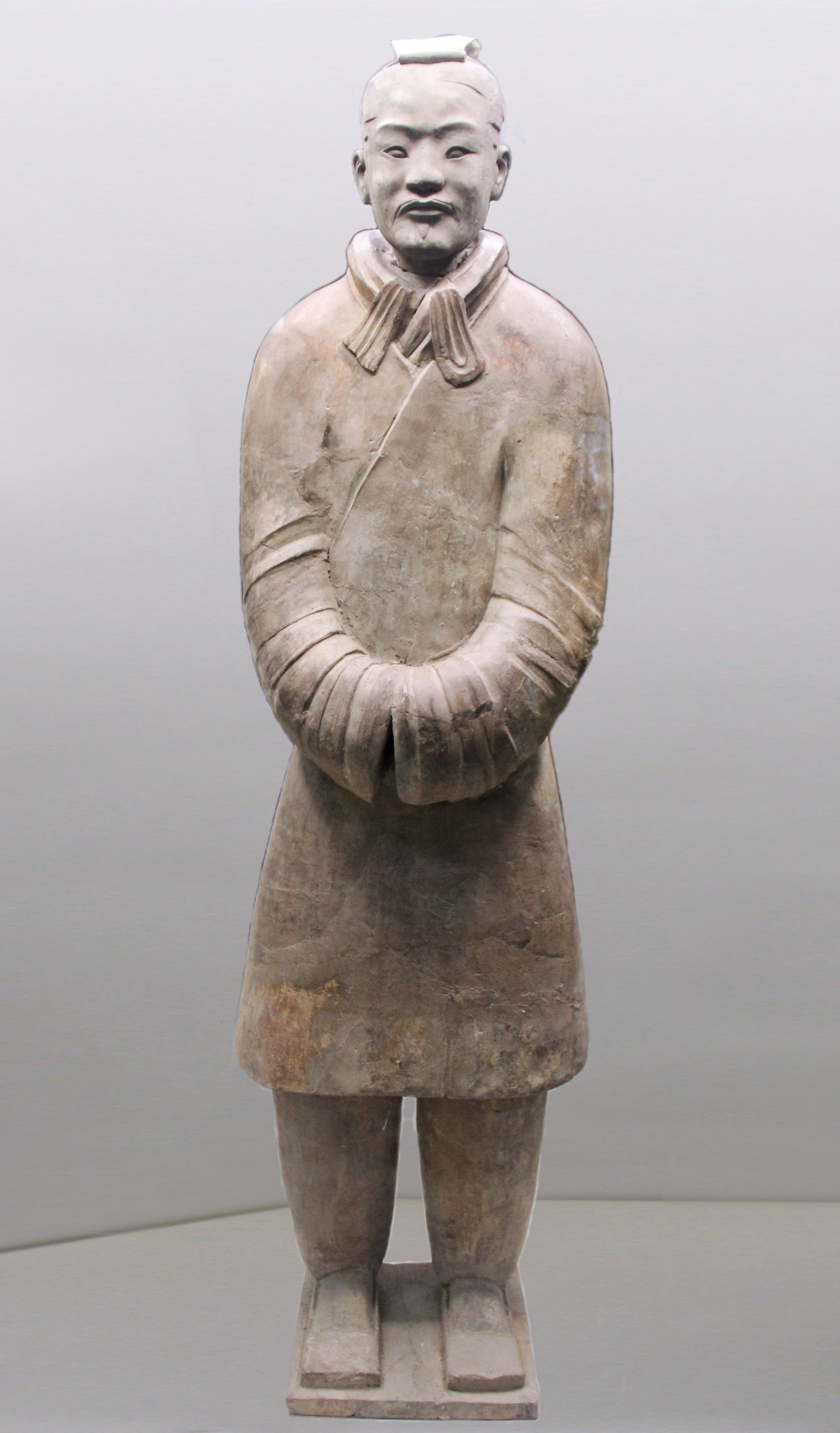
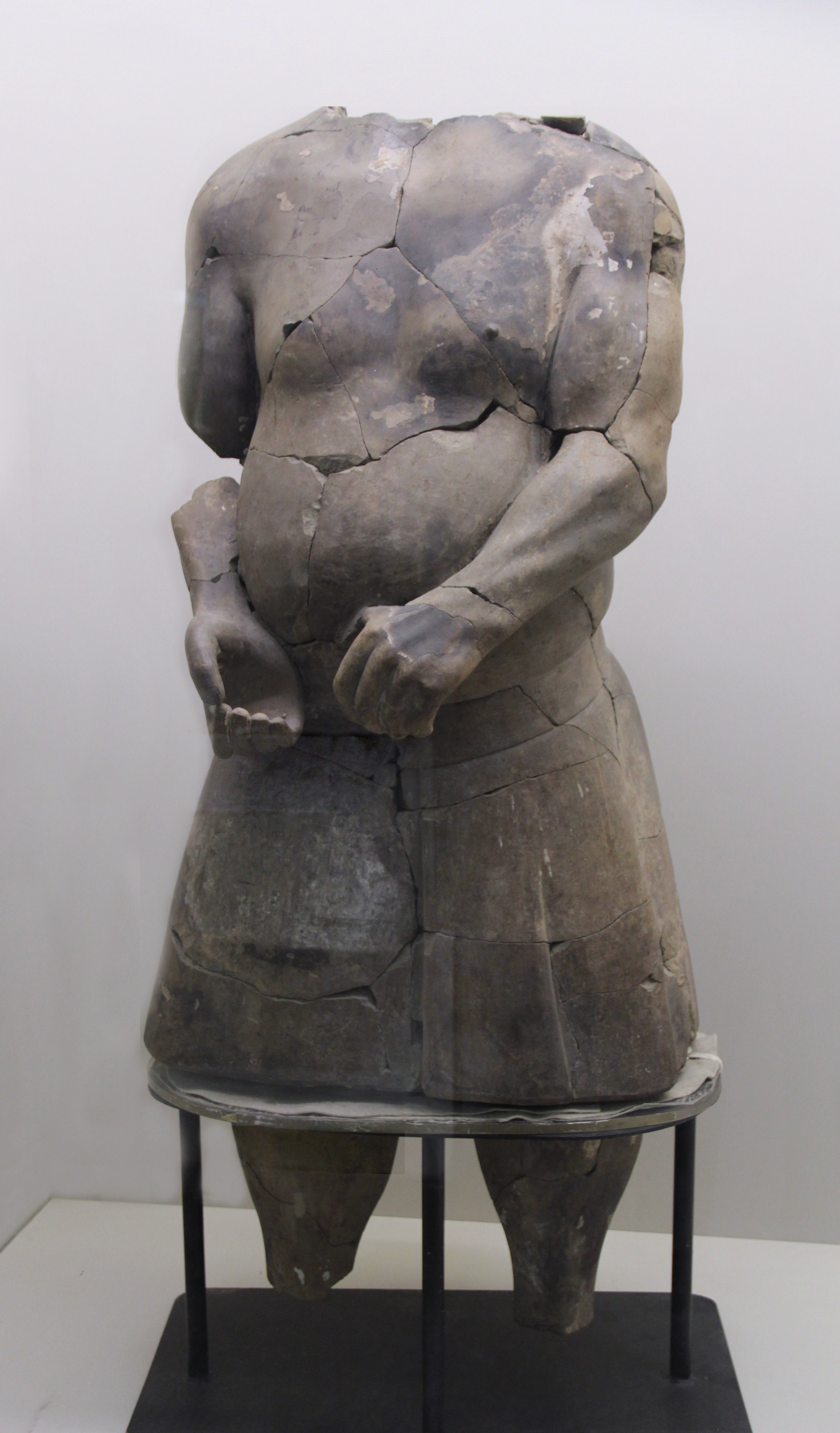
A Terracotta Army attendant, and one of the Acrobats. These were meant to guard the Mausoleum of the First Qin Emperor, 210 BCE

The Terracotta Army, inside the Mausoleum of the First Qin Emperor, consists of more than 7,000 life-size tomb terracotta figures of warriors and horses buried with the self-proclaimed first Emperor of China Qin Shi Huang in 210–209 BC. The figures were painted before being placed into the vault. The original colors were visible when the pieces were first unearthed. However, exposure to air caused the pigments to fade, so today the unearthed figures appear terracotta in color. The figures are in several poses including standing infantry and kneeling archers, as well as charioteers with horses. Each figure's head appears to be unique, showing a variety of facial features and expressions as well as hair styles. The spectacular realism displayed by the sculptures is an evidence of the advancement of art during the Qin dynasty. It is without precedent in the historical record of art in East Asia.

A music instrument called Qin-zither was developed during the Qin dynasty. The aesthetic components have always been as important as the functional parts on a musical instrument in Chinese history. The Qin-zither has seven strings. Although Qin-zither can sometimes remind people of corruptive history times, it is often considered as a delivery of peace and harmony.

==== Han art ====
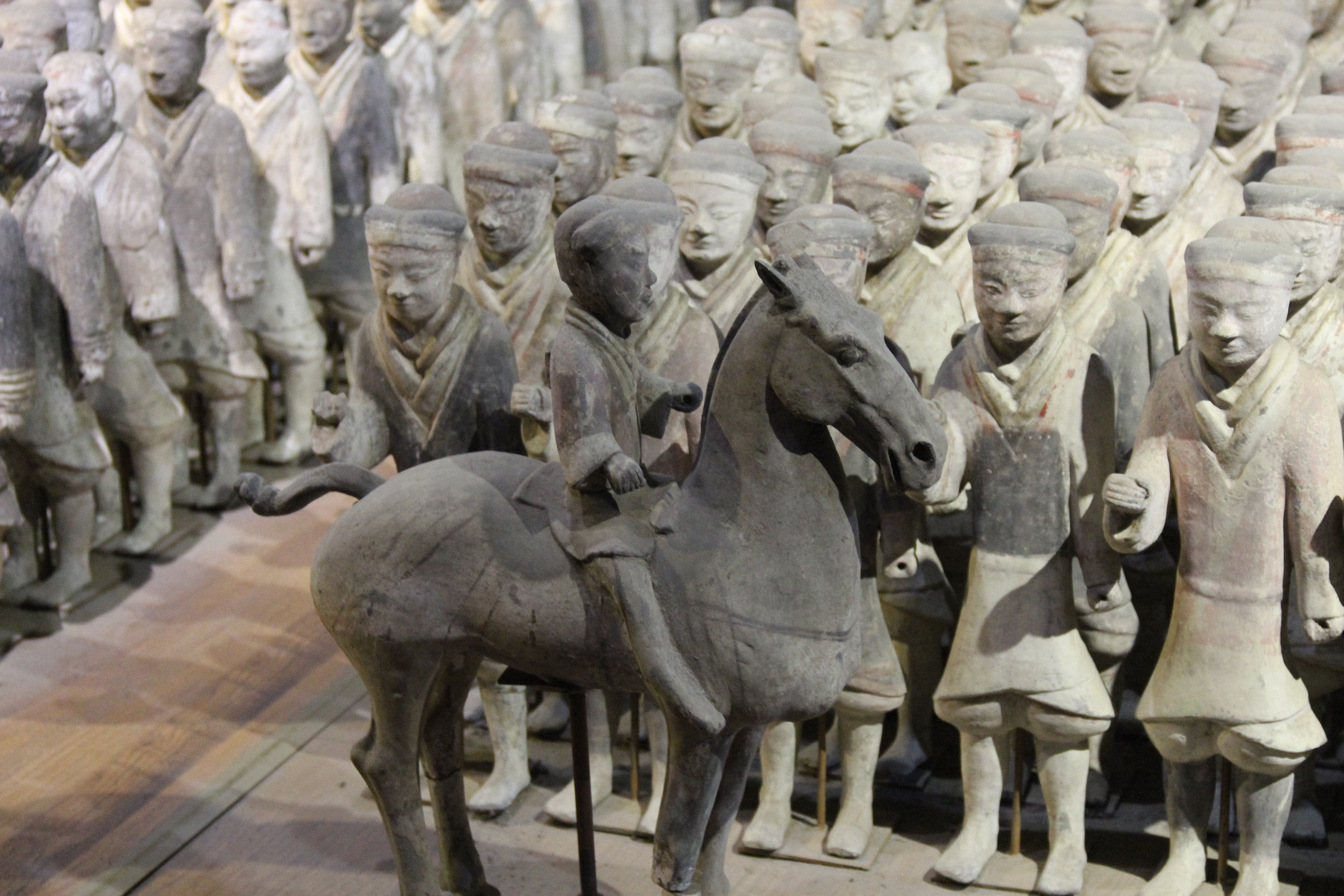
Western Han miniature pottery infantry and cavalry from Yangjiawan. After the Qin period, funeral figurines were much smaller, on average 60 centimeters (24 in) in height. Similar armies were found in Han Yang Ling, the tomb complex of Emperor Jing of Han (r. 157 – 141 BCE) and his wife Empress Wang Zhi (d. 126 BCE), with over 40,000 miniature pottery figures.

During the Qin dynasty, Chinese font, measurement systems, currency were all standardized in order to bring further unification. The Great Wall of China was expanded as a defensive construction against the northern intruders.

The Han dynasty was known for jade burial suits. One of the earliest known depictions of a landscape in Chinese art comes from a pair of hollow-tile door panels from a Western Han dynasty tomb near Zhengzhou, dated 60 BCE. A scene of continuous depth recession is conveyed by the zigzag of lines representing roads and garden walls, giving the impression that one is looking down from the top of a hill. This artistic landscape scene was made by the repeated impression of standard stamps on the clay while it was still soft and not yet fired. However, the oldest known landscape art scene tradition in the classical sense of painting is a work by Zhan Ziqian of the Sui dynasty (581–618).

Other than jade artifacts, bronze is another favorite medium for artists since it is hard and durable. Bronze mirrors have been mass-produced in the Han dynasty, and almost every tomb excavated that has been dated as Han dynasty has mirror in the burial. The reflective side is usually made by a composition of bronze, copper, tin, and lead. The word "mirror" means "to reflect" or "to look into" in Chinese, so bronze mirrors have been used as a trope for reflecting the reality. The ancient Chinese believe that mirror can act as a representation of the reality, which could make them more aware of the current situation; also, mirrors are used as a media to convey or present a reflection of the past events. The bronze mirrors made in the Han dynasty always have complex decorations on their non-reflective side; some of them consist narratives that tell stories. The narratives themselves always reflect the common but essential theories to the Han people's lives.

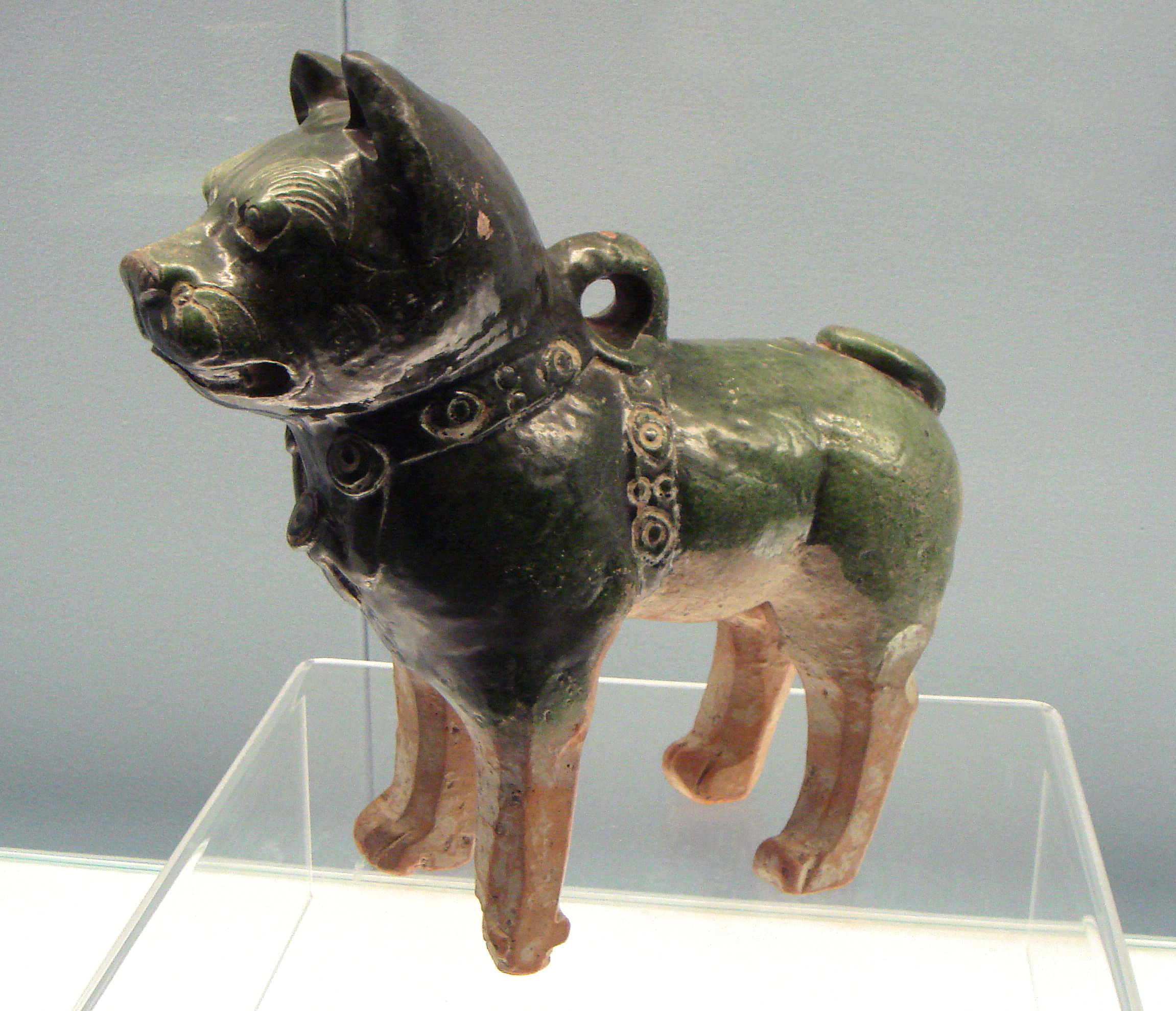
Glazed pottery dog, with collar patterned onto the surface; Eastern Han, 1st century CE.

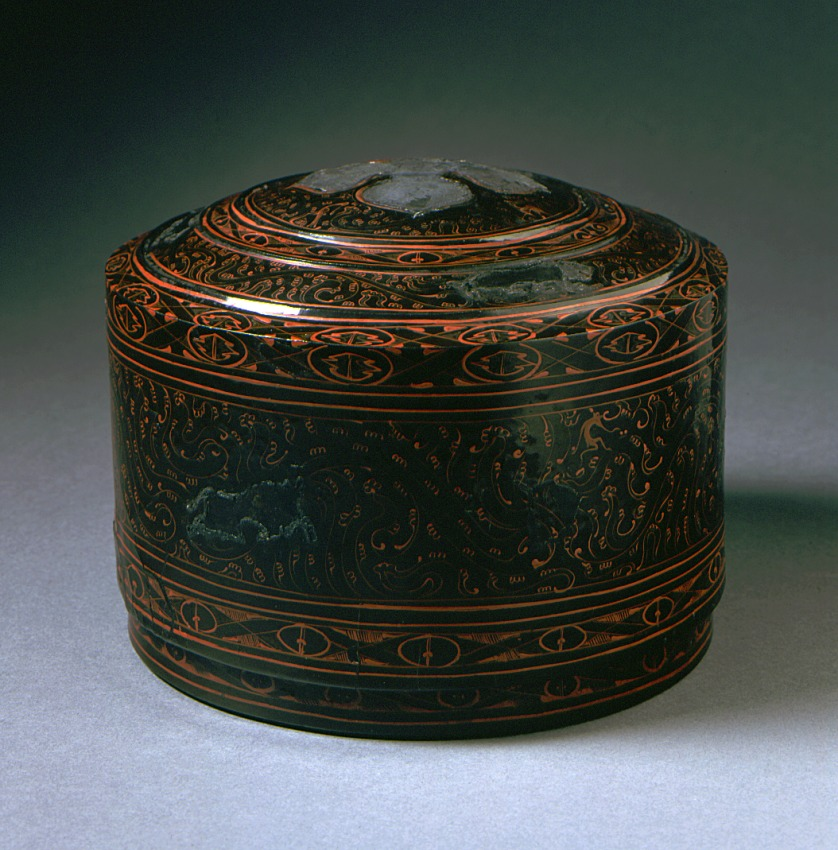
Han dynasty lacquerwares were famed for their intricate and elegant designs.

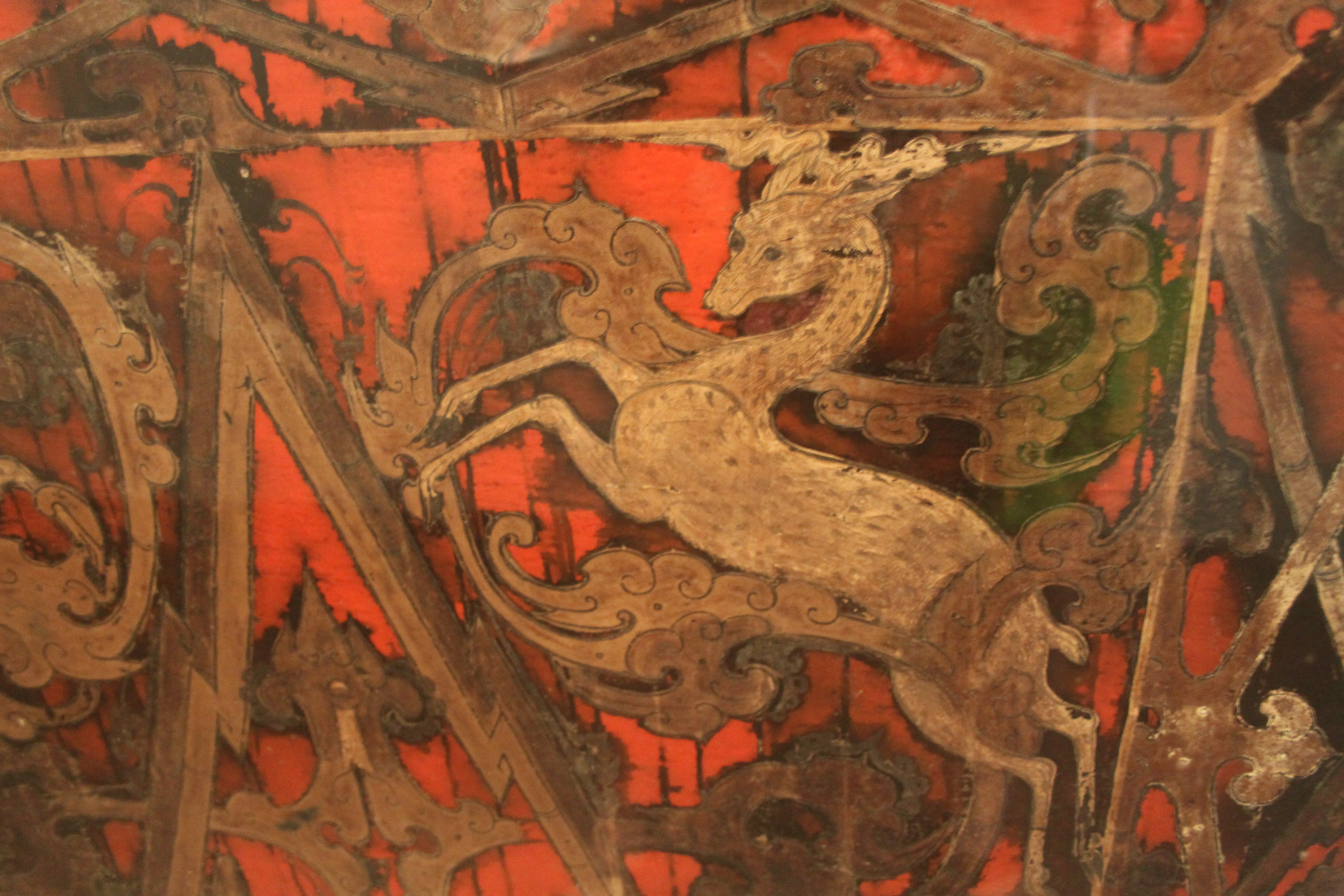
Abstract yet intricate patterns were found on coffins of lady Xin Zhui (217 BC–168 BC)

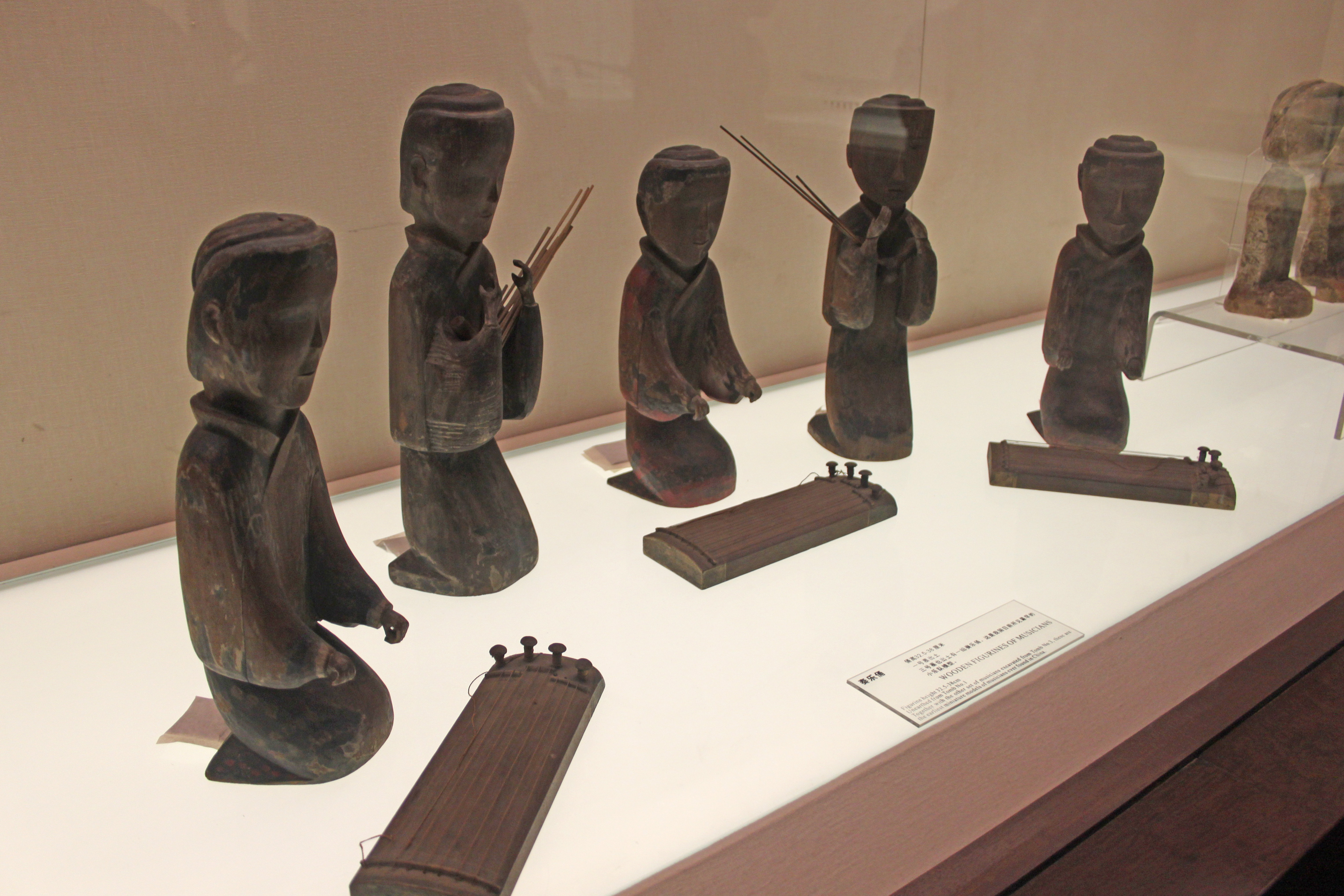
Musicians playing guzheng and sheng, 2nd century BCE

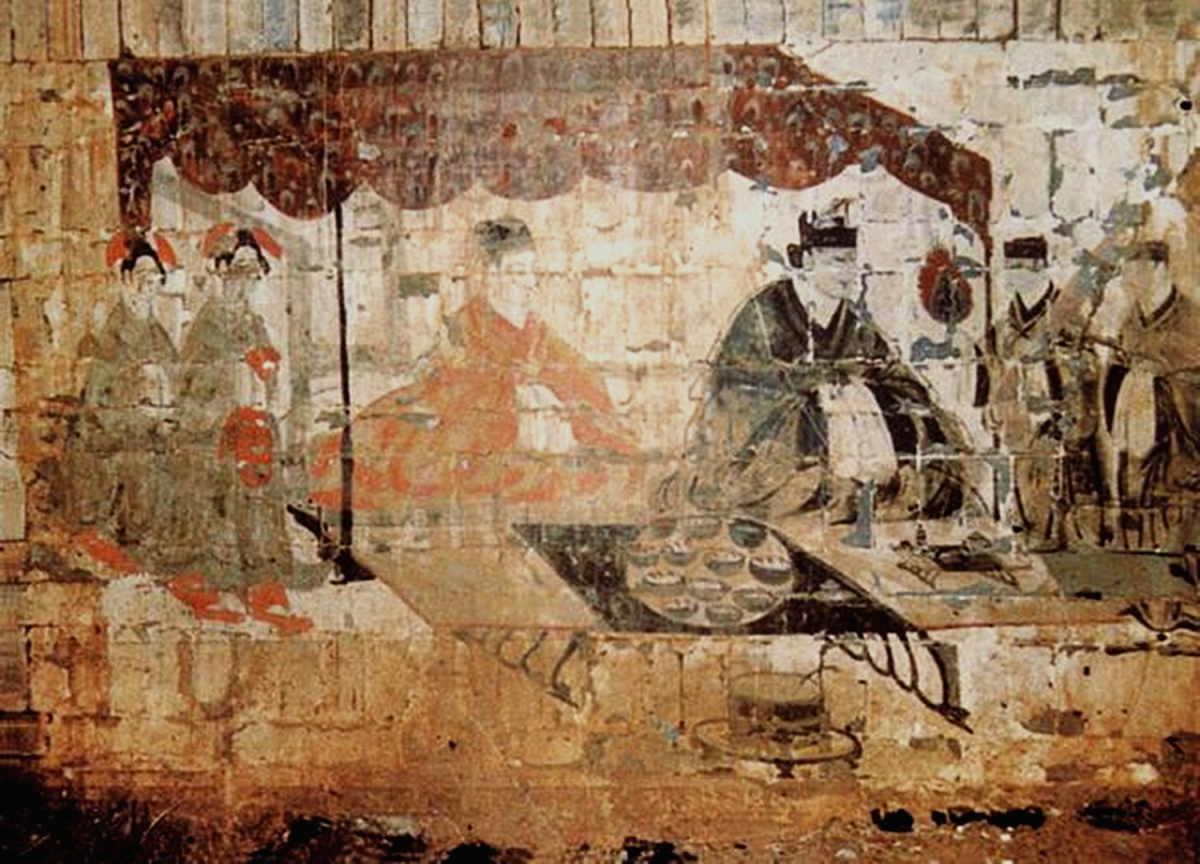
Han couple banquet together, from Luoyang c. 220 CE

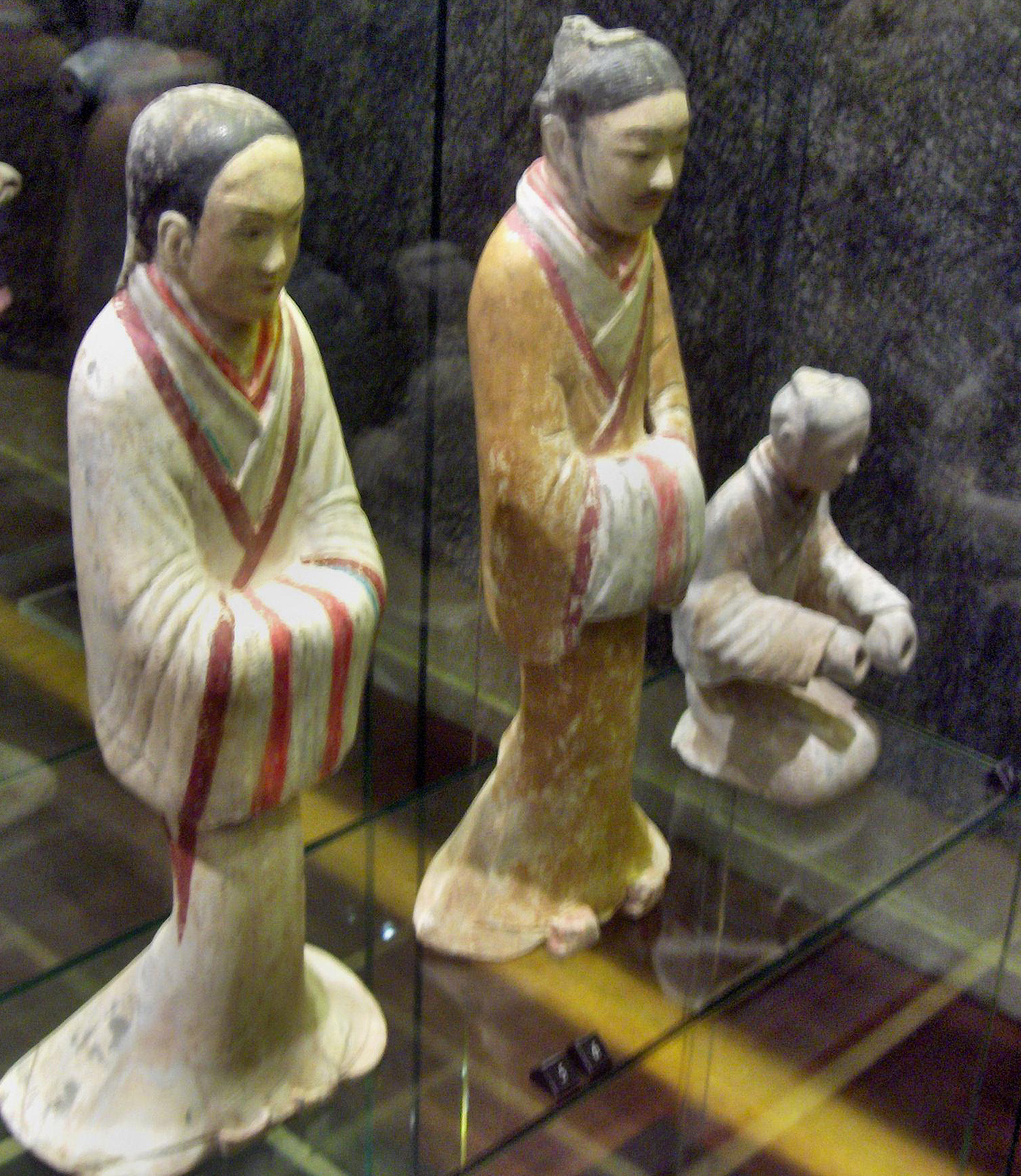
A female servant and a male advisor in Han shenyi, terracotta figurines from Western Han.

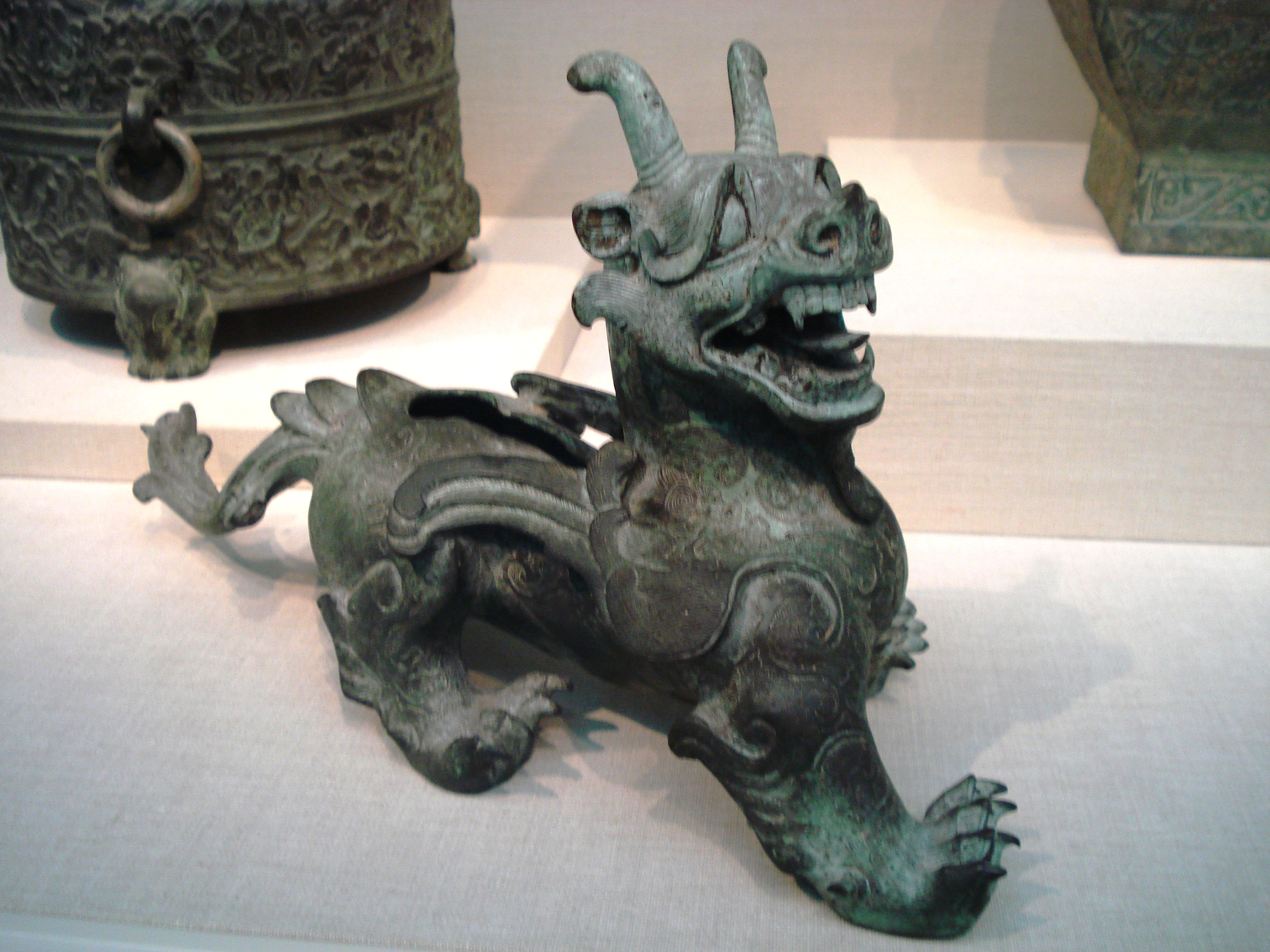
Bronze statuette of a qilin, 1st century AD

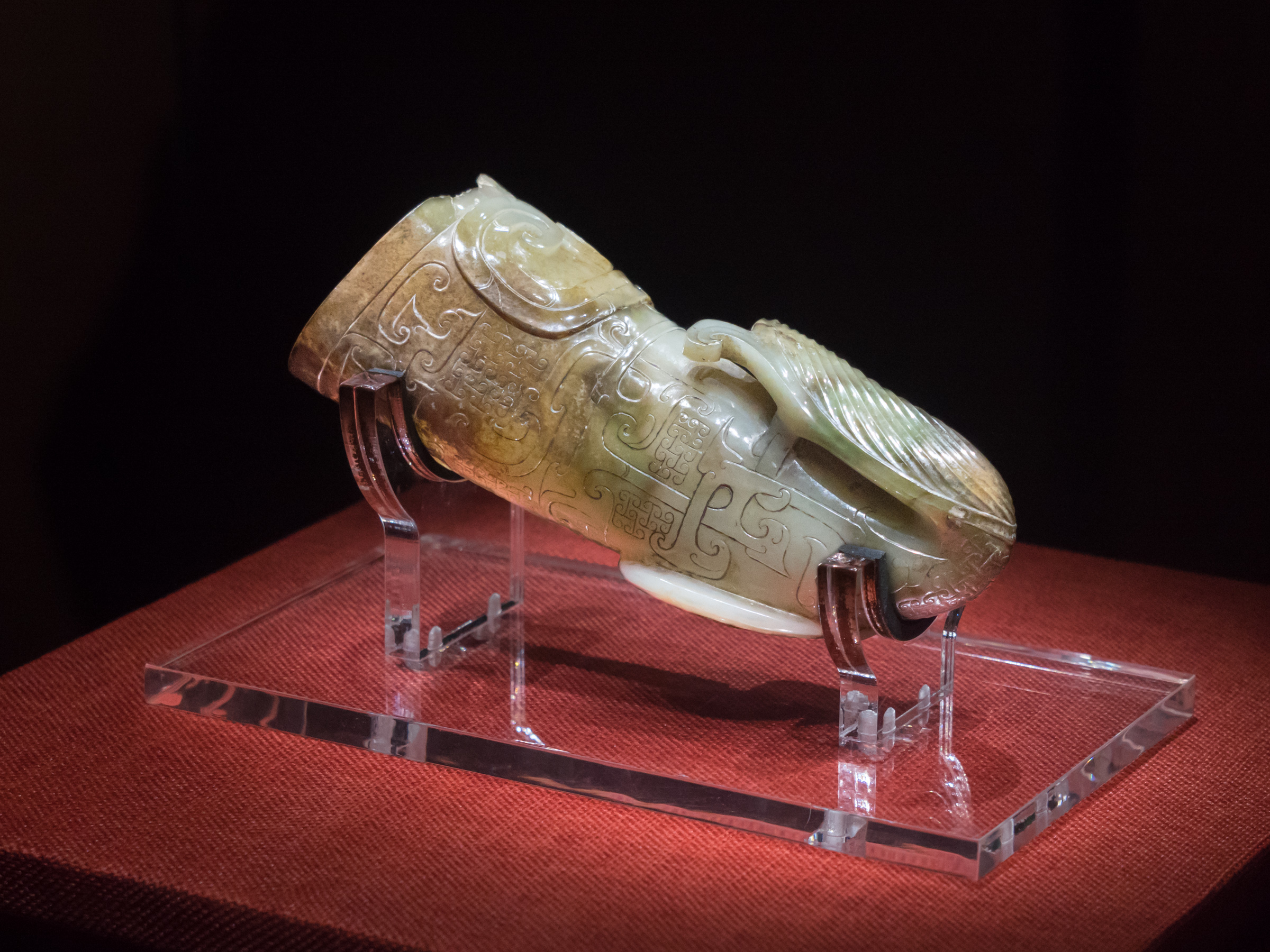
Jade drinking vessel from Nannie, 1st century BCE

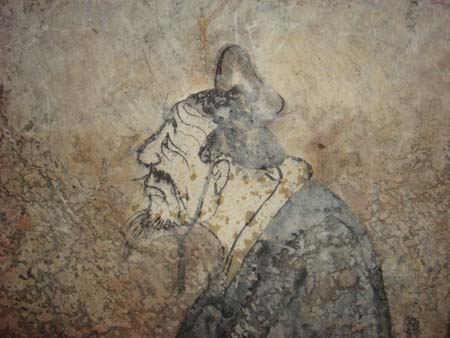
Western Han tomb fresco depicting the philosopher Confucius; 202 BCE – 9 CE; from Dongping County, Shandong

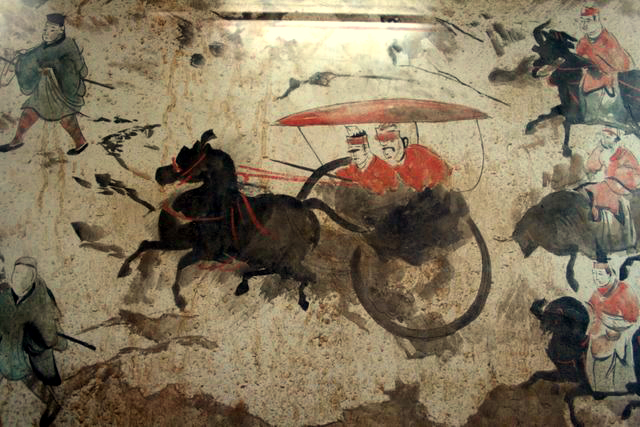
A section of an Eastern Han (25–220 AD) fresco of 9 chariots, 50 horses, and over 70 men, from a tomb in Luoyang, China

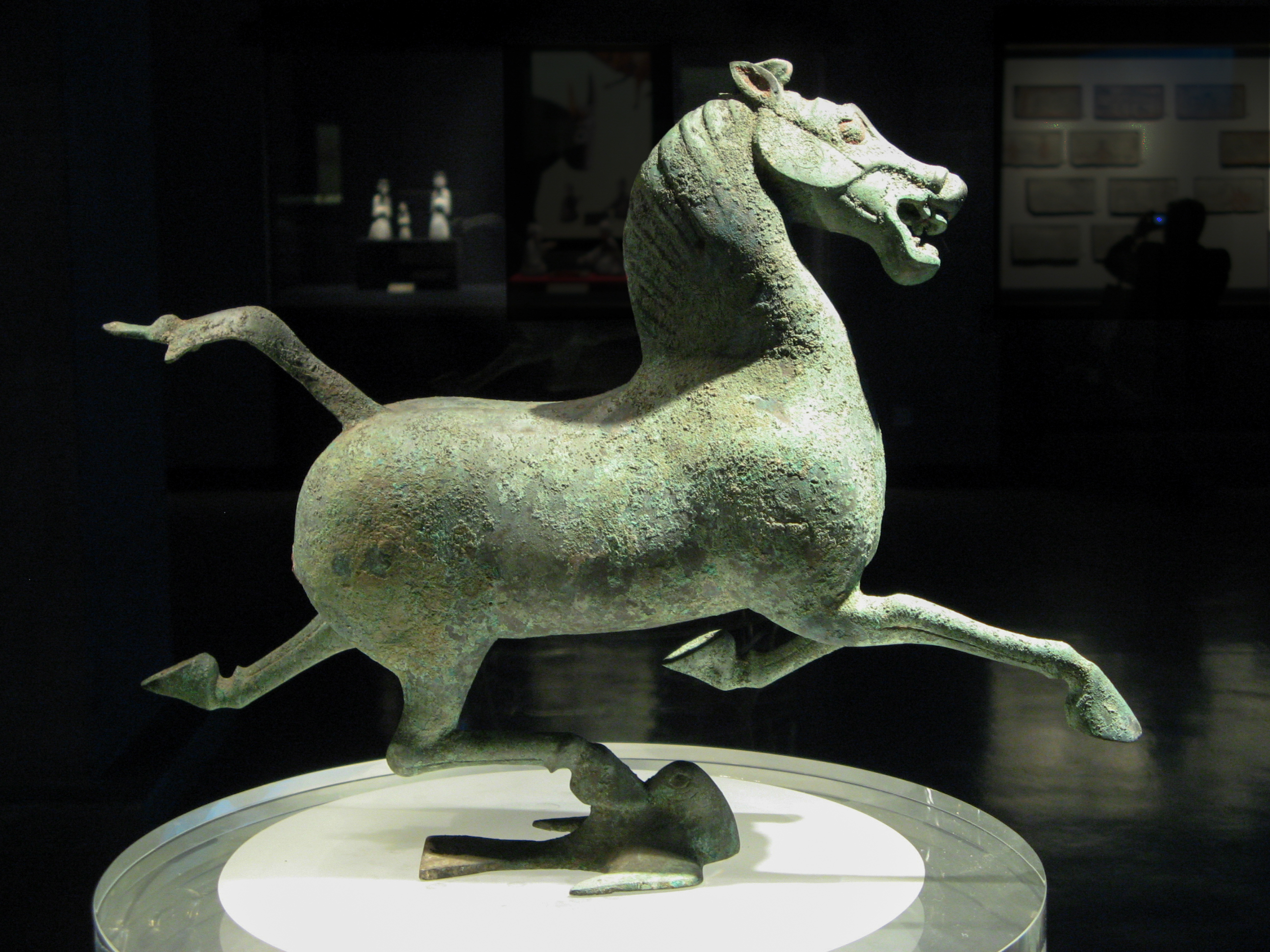
Flying Horse of Gansu.

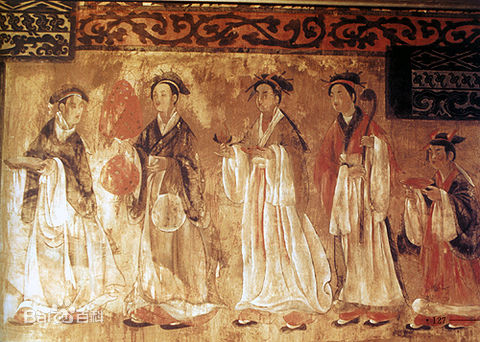
Mural of the Dahuting Tomb (打虎亭漢墓; Dáhǔtíng hàn mù) of the late Eastern Han, located in Zhengzhou

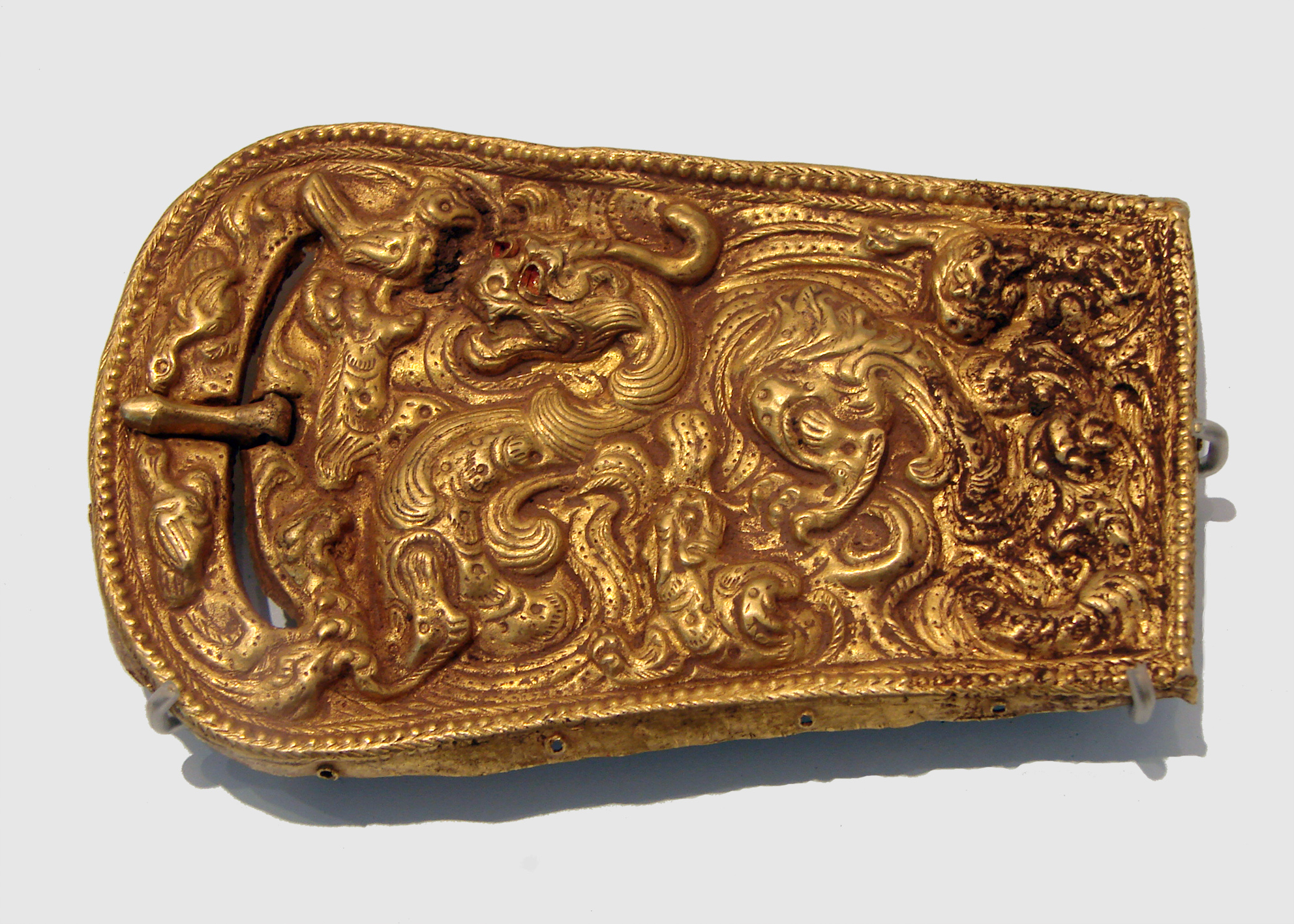
A golden belt buckle with dragon motif, Western Han

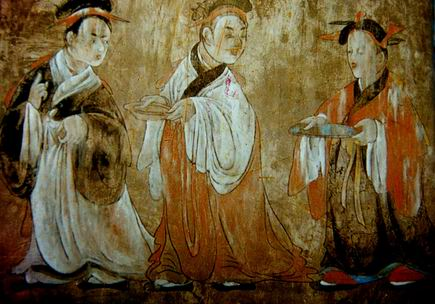
Mural of the Dahuting Tomb (打虎亭漢墓; Dáhǔtíng hàn mù) of the late Eastern Han, located in Zhengzhou, Henan

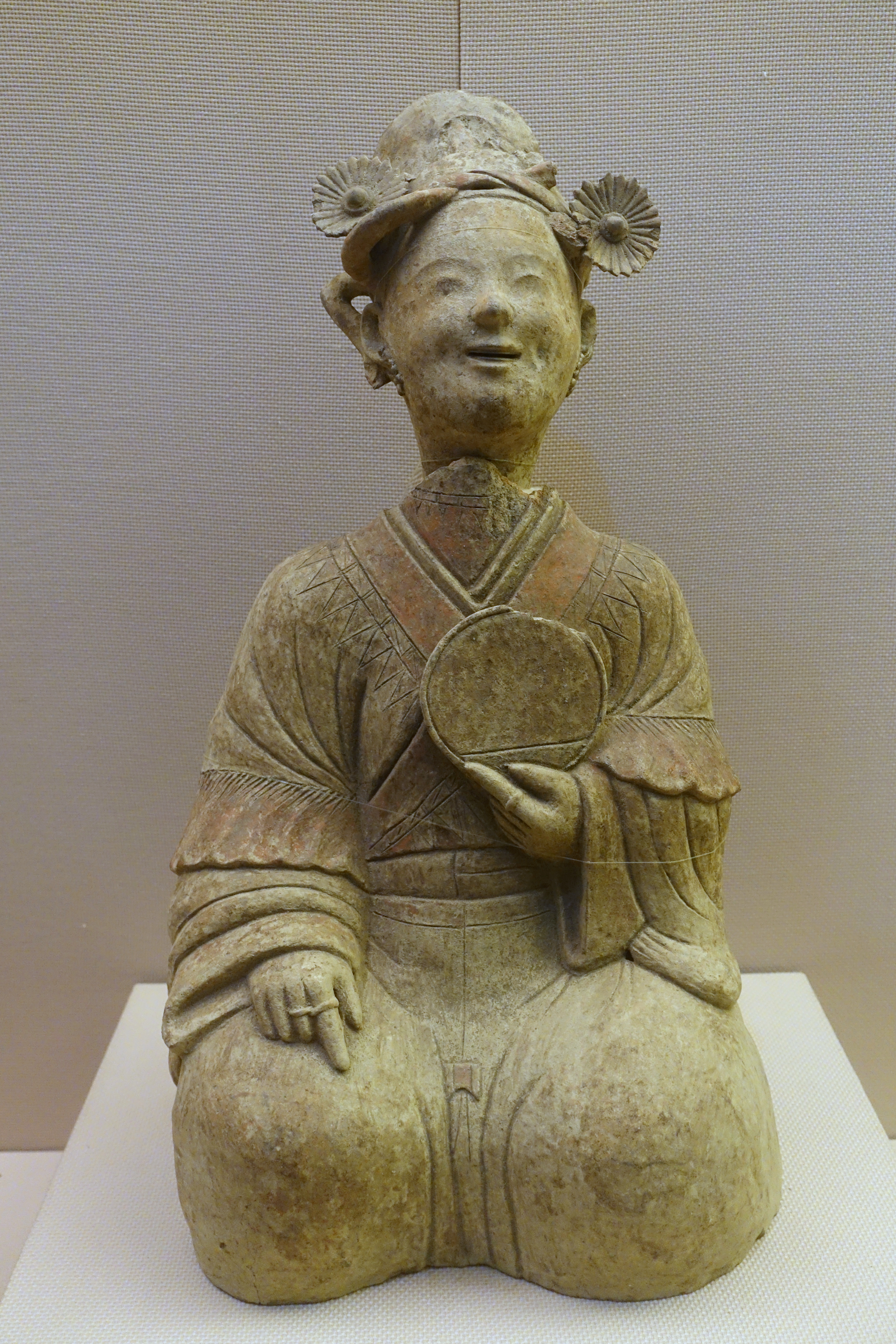
An Eastern Han ceramic figurine of a seated woman with a bronze mirror, unearthed from a tomb of Songjialin, Pi County, Sichuan

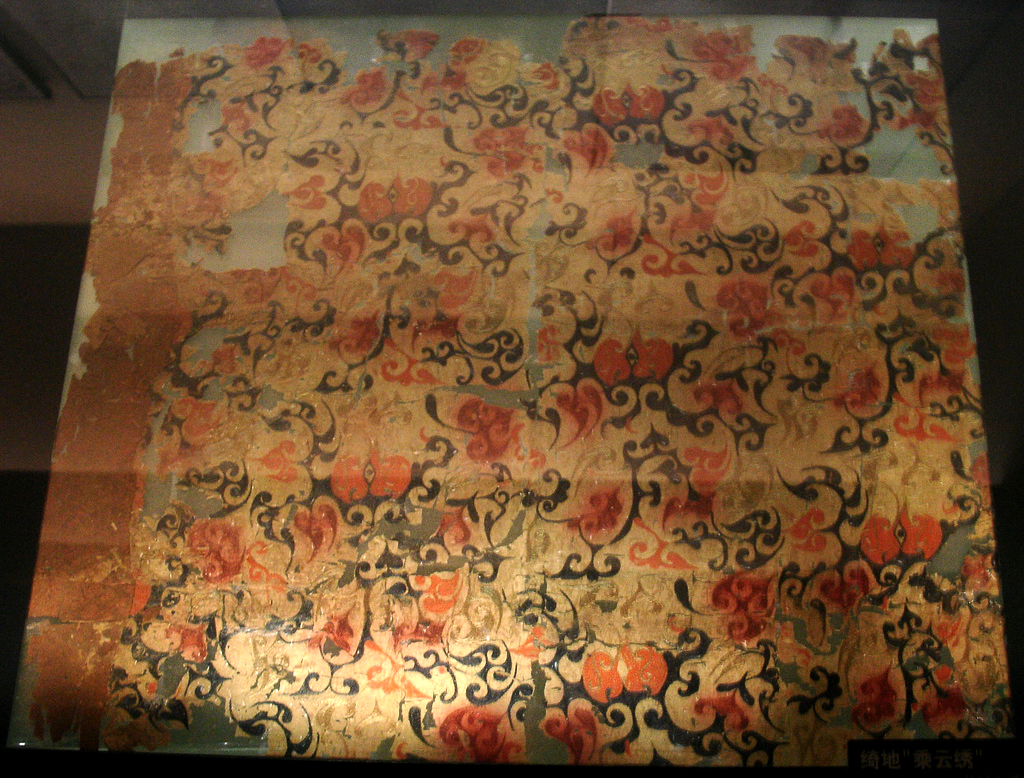
Heaves of silk with all sorts of intricate designs were found at Mawangdui.

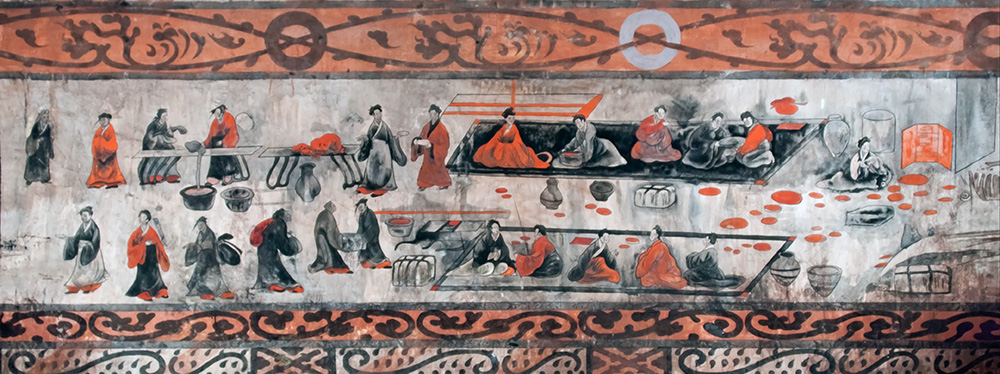
Mural depicting a banquet at Dahuting

==== First monumental stone sculptures (117 BCE) ====
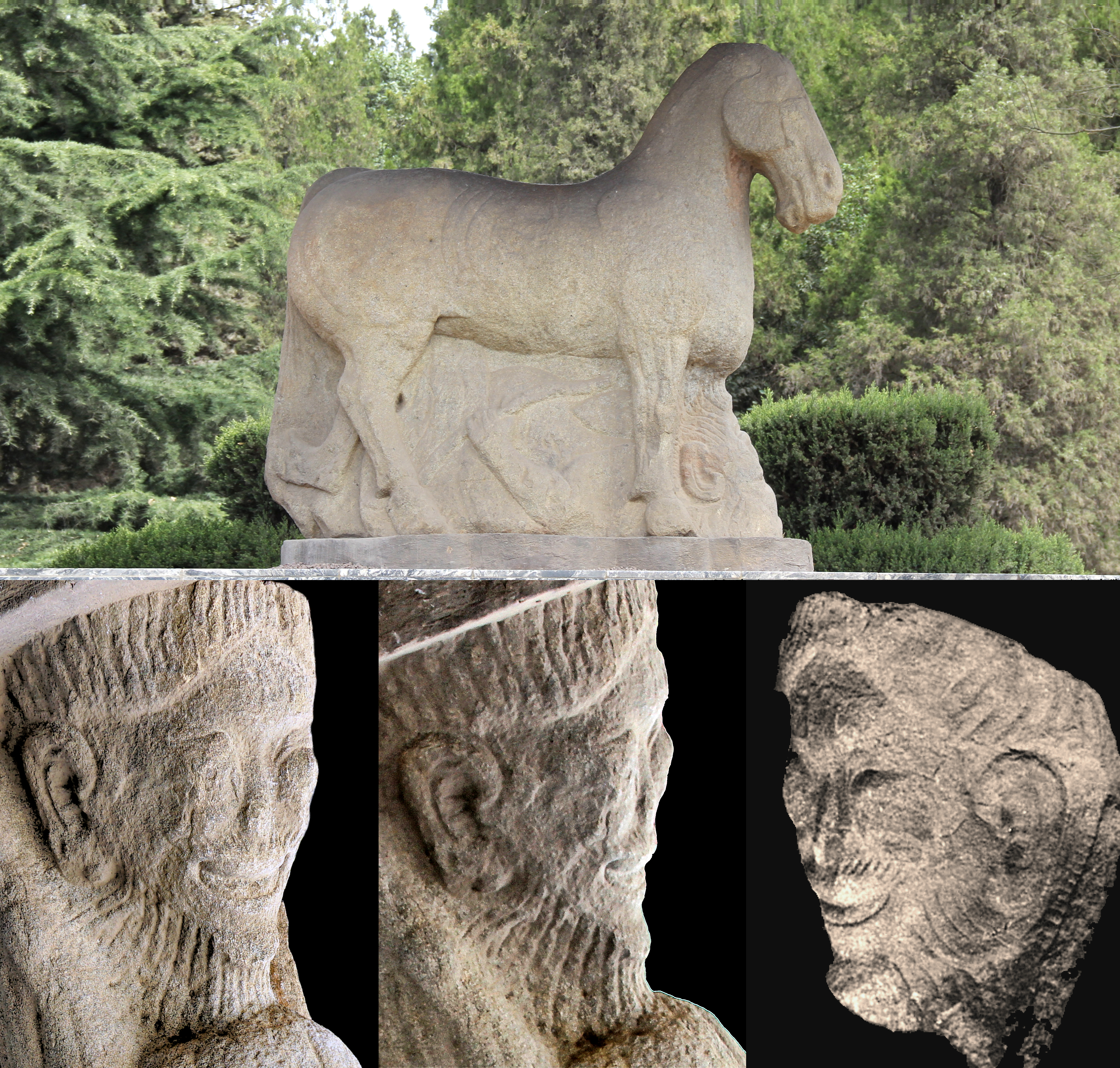
The monumental stone sculpture of a horse trampling a Xiongnu warrior (with detail of the warrior's head) at Huo Qubing's Mausoleum, 117 BCE

Terracotta statuettes had been known for a long time in China, but there are no known examples of monumental stone statuary before the stone sculptures at the Mausoleum of Huo Qubing (140–117 BCE), a general of Emperor Han Wudi who went to the western regions to fight the Xiongnu. In literary sources, there is only a single 3rd–4th century CE record of a possible earlier example: two alleged monumental stone statues of qilin (Chinese unicorns) said have been set up on top of the tomb of the First Emperor Qin Shihuang. The most famous of Huo Qubing's statues is that of a horse trampling a Xiongnu warrior.

The Mausoleum of Huo Qubing (located in Maoling, the Mausoleum of Han Wudi) has 15 more stone sculptures. These are less naturalistic than the "Horse trampling a Xiongnu", and tend to follow the natural shape of the stone, with details of the figures only emerging in high-relief. Following these early attempts, the usage of monumental stone statues would only develop from the end of the Western Han to the Eastern Han.

Monumental stone statuary would become a major art form from the 4–6th centuries CE with the onset of monumental Buddhist sculpture in China.

=== Period of division (220–581) ===
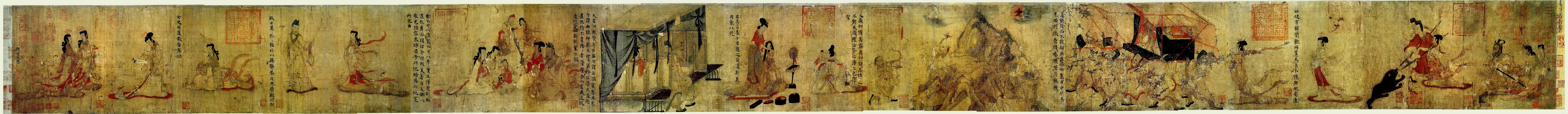
Admonitions Scroll by Gu Kaizhi (348-405), heavily damaged after it was looted during the Second Opium War

==== Influence of Buddhism ====
Buddhism arrived in China around the 1st century CE (although there are some traditions about a monk visiting China during Asoka's reign), and through to the 8th century it became very active and creative in the development of Buddhist art, particularly in the area of statuary. Receiving this distant religion, China soon incorporated strong Chinese traits in its artistic expression.

In the fifth to sixth century the Northern dynasties, rather removed from the original sources of inspiration, tended to develop rather symbolic and abstract modes of representation, with schematic lines. Their style is also said to be solemn and majestic. The lack of corporeality of this art, and its distance from the original Buddhist objective of expressing the pure ideal of enlightenment in an accessible, realistic manner, progressively led to a research towards more naturalism and realism, leading to the expression of Tang Buddhist art.

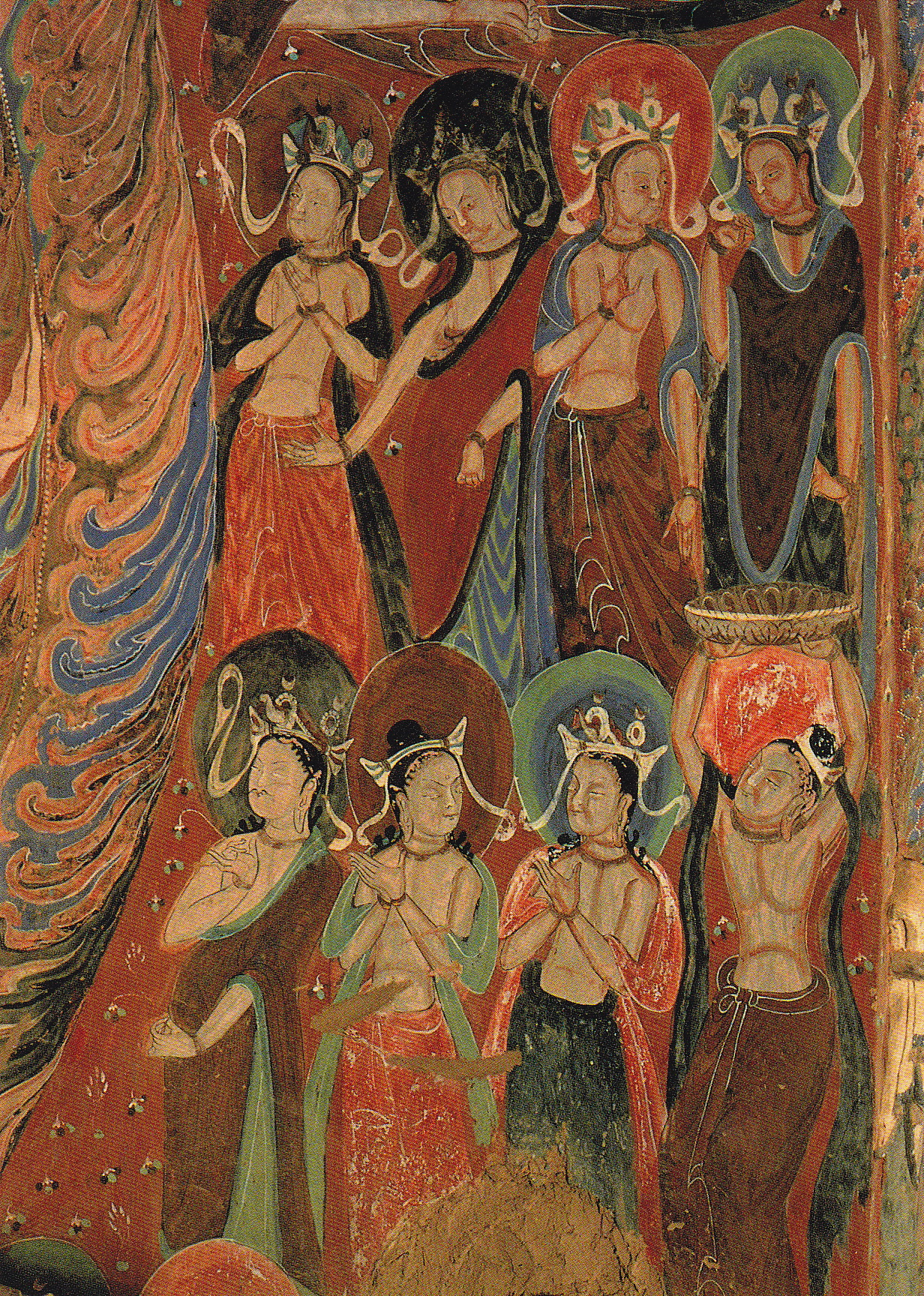
Mural from the Mogao caves, Western Wei, (535-556 A.D.)

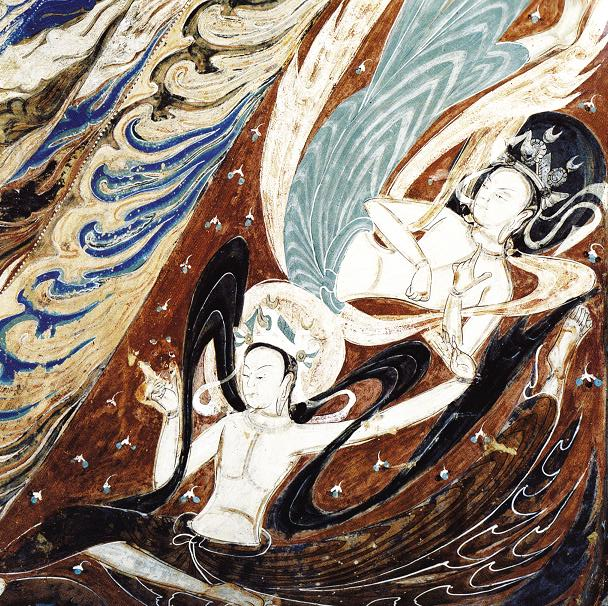
Dunhuang mural, mid 6th century

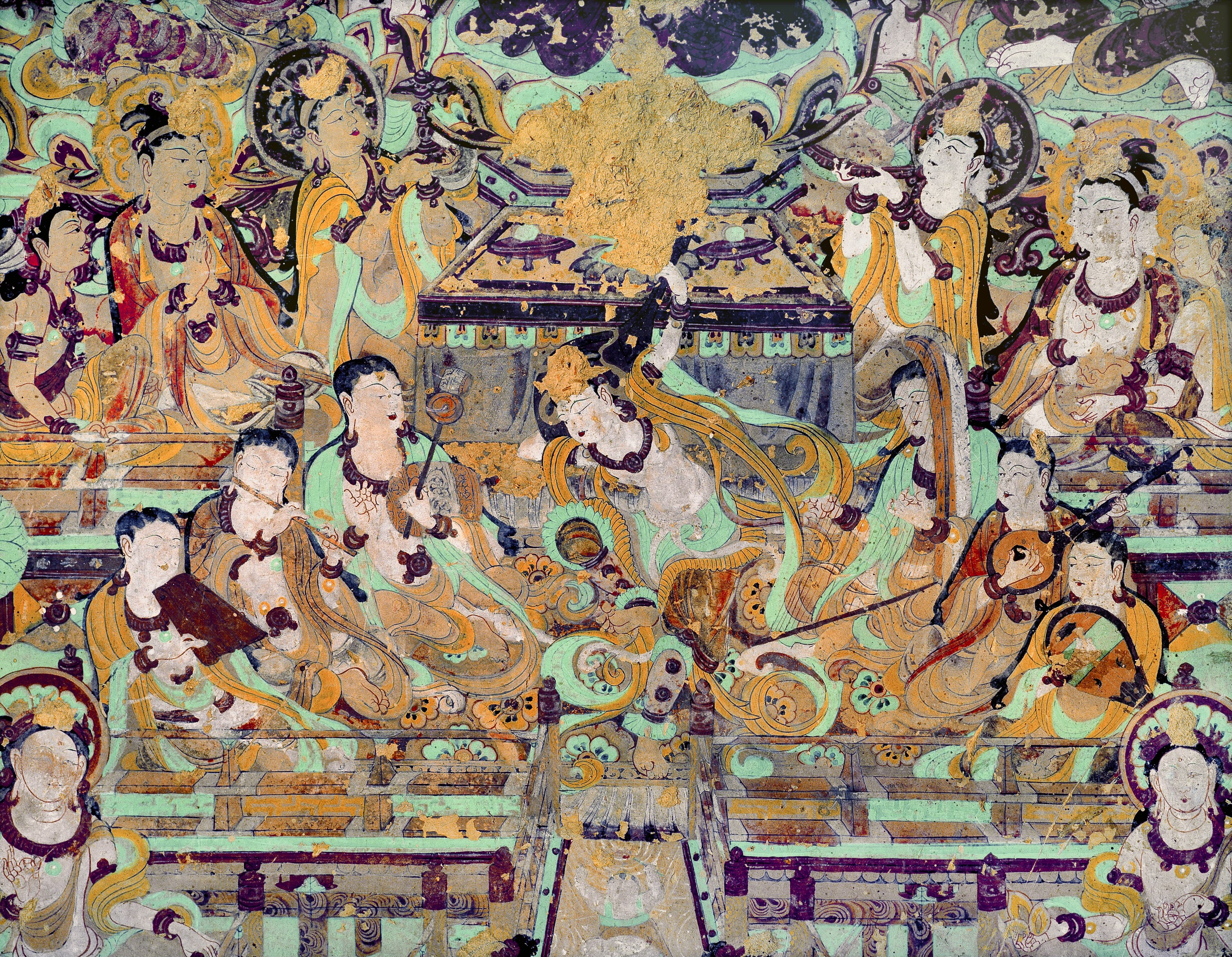
Buddhist cave art, a dancer spins while the orchestra plays.

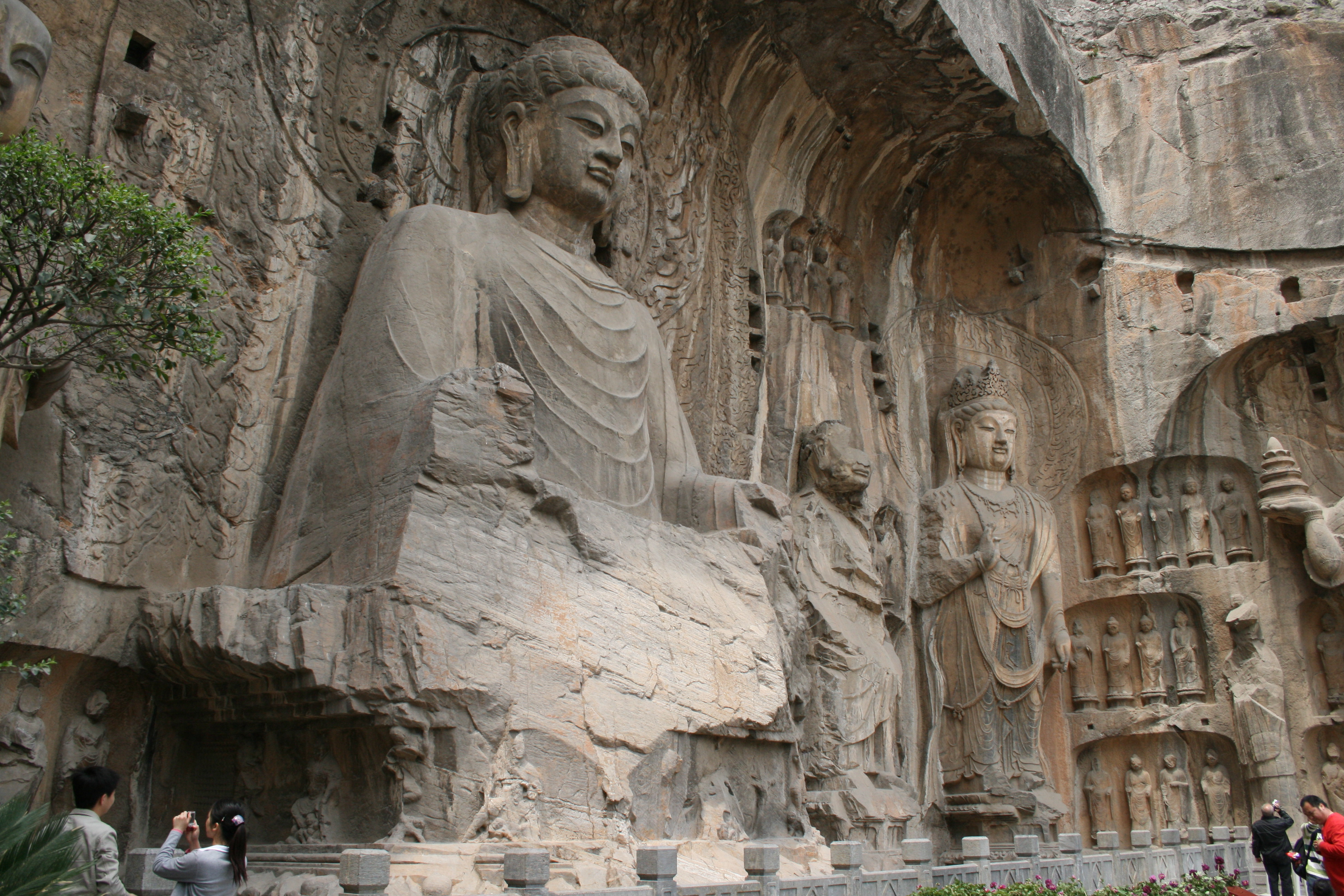
Vairocana, Longmen Grottoes, 500-900AD

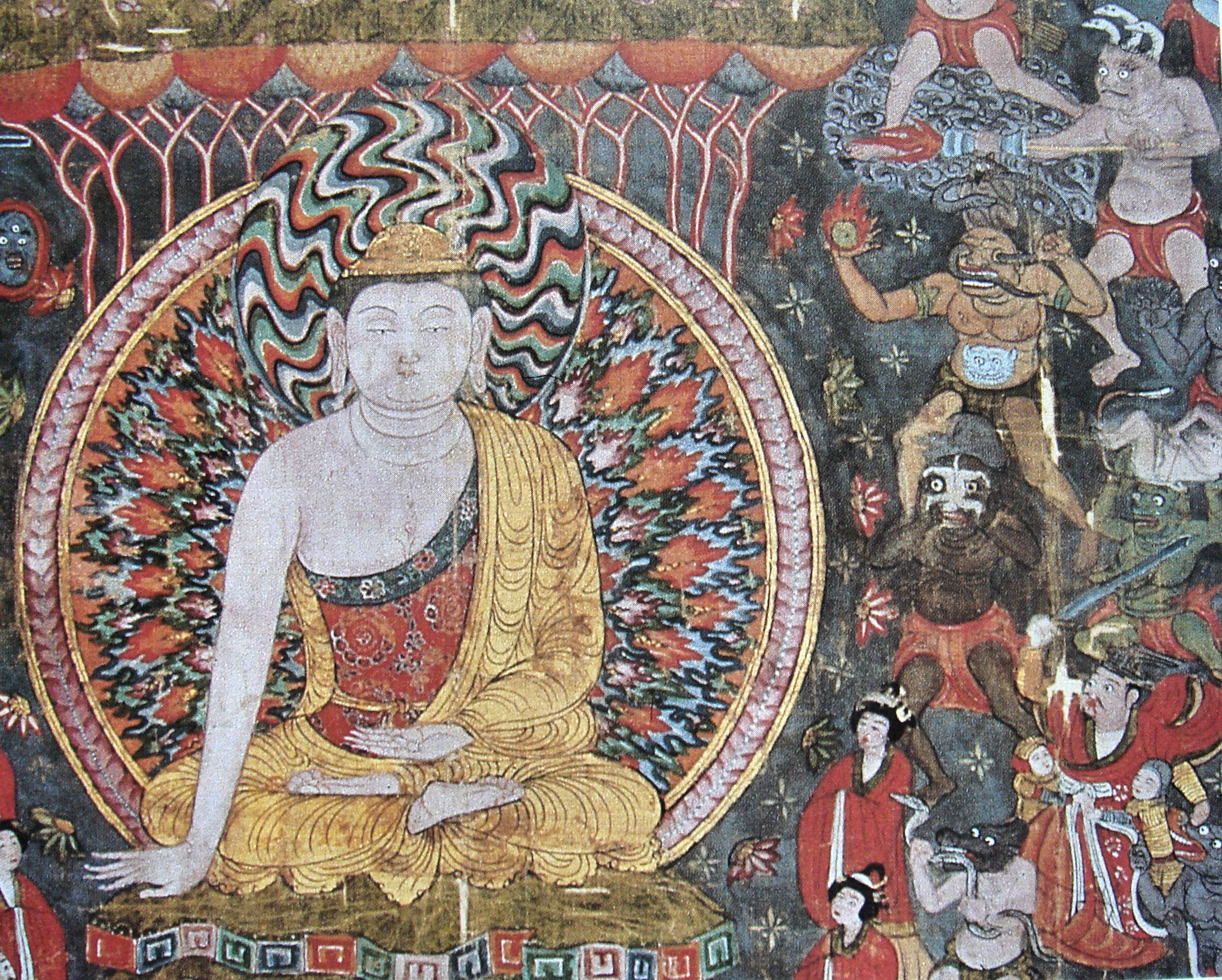
An illustration of Sakyamuni's temptation by Mara

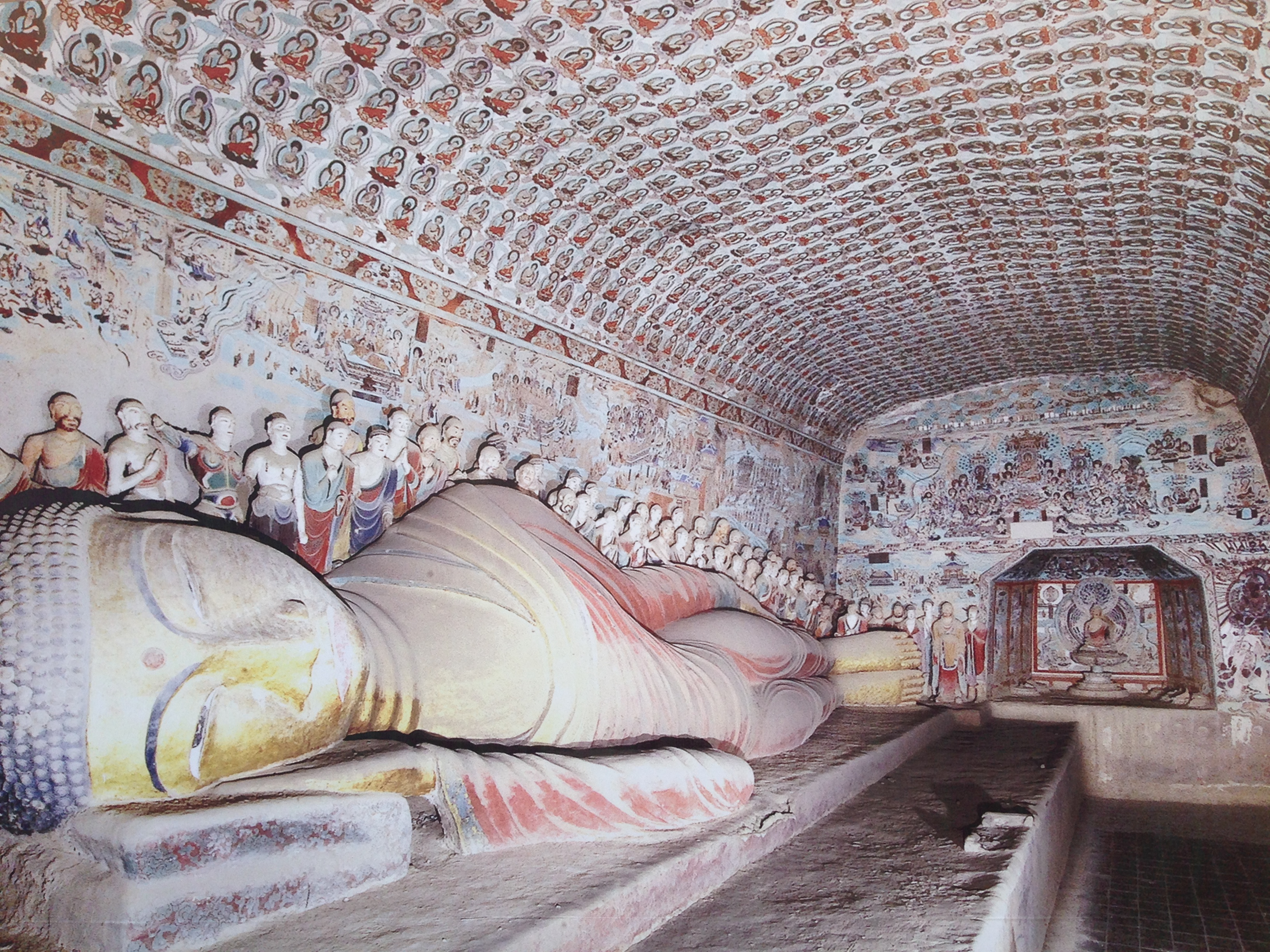
Reclining Buddha, High Tang period

==== Calligraphy ====
In ancient China, painting and calligraphy were the most highly appreciated arts in court circles and were produced almost exclusively by amateurs, aristocrats and scholar-officials who alone had the leisure to perfect the technique and sensibility necessary for great brushwork. Calligraphy was thought to be the highest and purest form of painting. The implements were the brush, made of animal hair, and black ink made from pine soot and animal glue. Writing as well as painting was done on silk. But after the invention of paper in the 1st century, silk was gradually replaced by the new and cheaper material. Original writings by famous calligraphers have been greatly valued throughout China's history and are mounted on scrolls and hung on walls in the same way that paintings are.

Wang Xizhi was a famous Chinese calligrapher who lived in the 4th century AD. His most famous work is the Lanting Xu, the preface to a collection of poems. The script was often celebrated as the high point of the semi-cursive "Running Style" in the history of Chinese calligraphy.

Wei Shuo was a well-known calligrapher of the Eastern Jin dynasty who established consequential rules about the regular script. Her well-known works include Famous Concubine Inscription (名姬帖 Ming Ji Tie) and The Inscription of Wei-shi He'nan (衛氏和南帖 Wei-shi He'nan Tie).

==== Painting ====
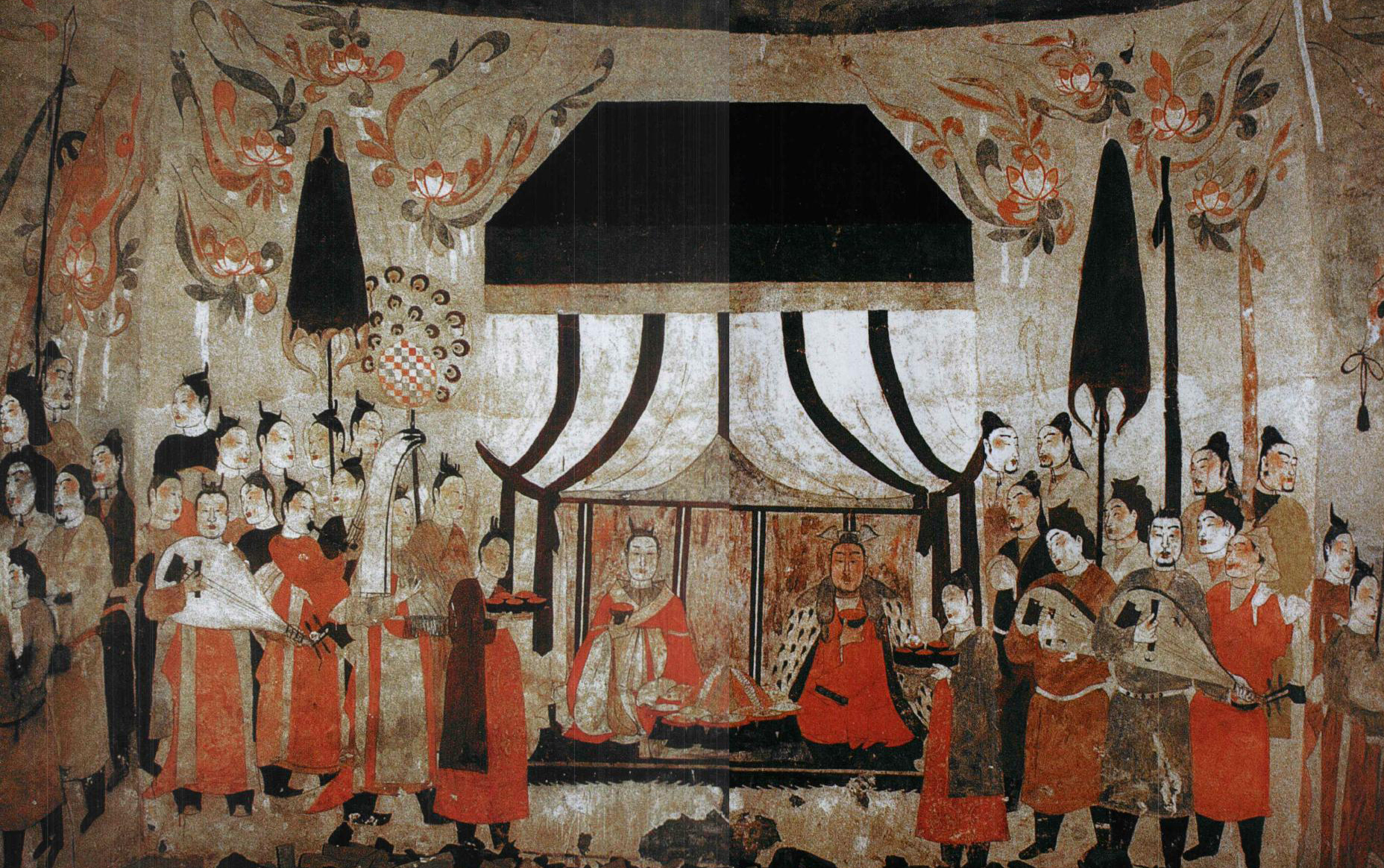
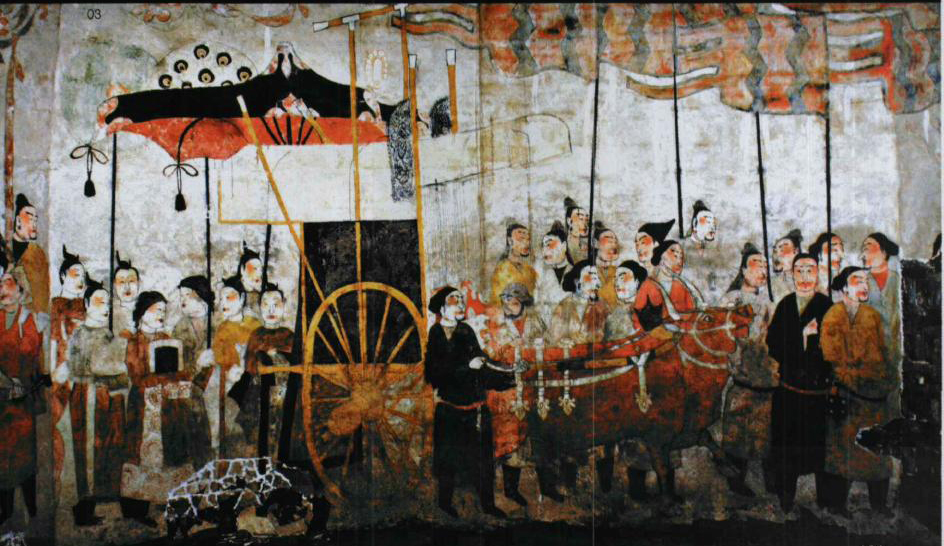
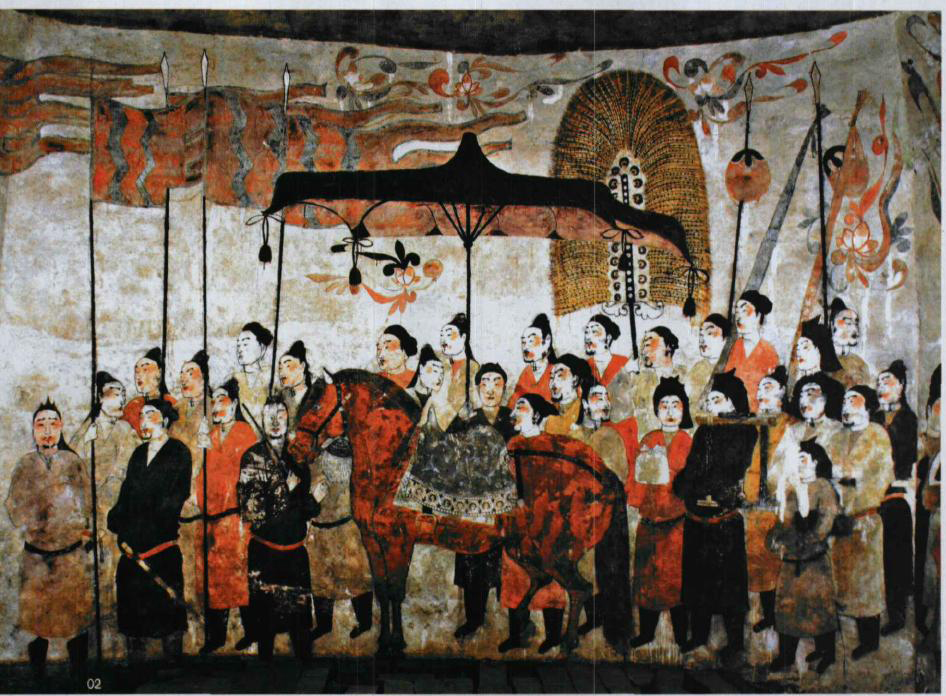
Mural paintings of court life in Xu Xianxiu's Tomb, Northern Qi dynasty, 571 AD, located in Taiyuan, Shanxi province

Gu Kaizhi is a celebrated painter of ancient China born in Wuxi. He wrote three books about painting theory: On Painting (畫論), Introduction of Famous Paintings of Wei and Jin Dynasties (魏晉名畫記) and Painting Yuntai Mountain (畫雲臺山記). He wrote, "In figure paintings the clothes and the appearances were not very important. The eyes were the spirit and the decisive factor." Three of Gu's paintings still survive today: Admonitions of the Instructress to the Court Ladies, Nymph of the Luo River (洛神賦), and Wise and Benevolent Women.

There are other examples of Jin dynasty painting from tombs. This includes the Seven Sages of the Bamboo Grove, painted on a brick wall of a tomb located near modern Nanjing and now found in the Shaanxi Provincial Museum. Each of the figures are labeled and shown either drinking, writing, or playing a musical instrument. Other tomb paintings also depict scenes of daily life, such as men plowing fields with teams of oxen.

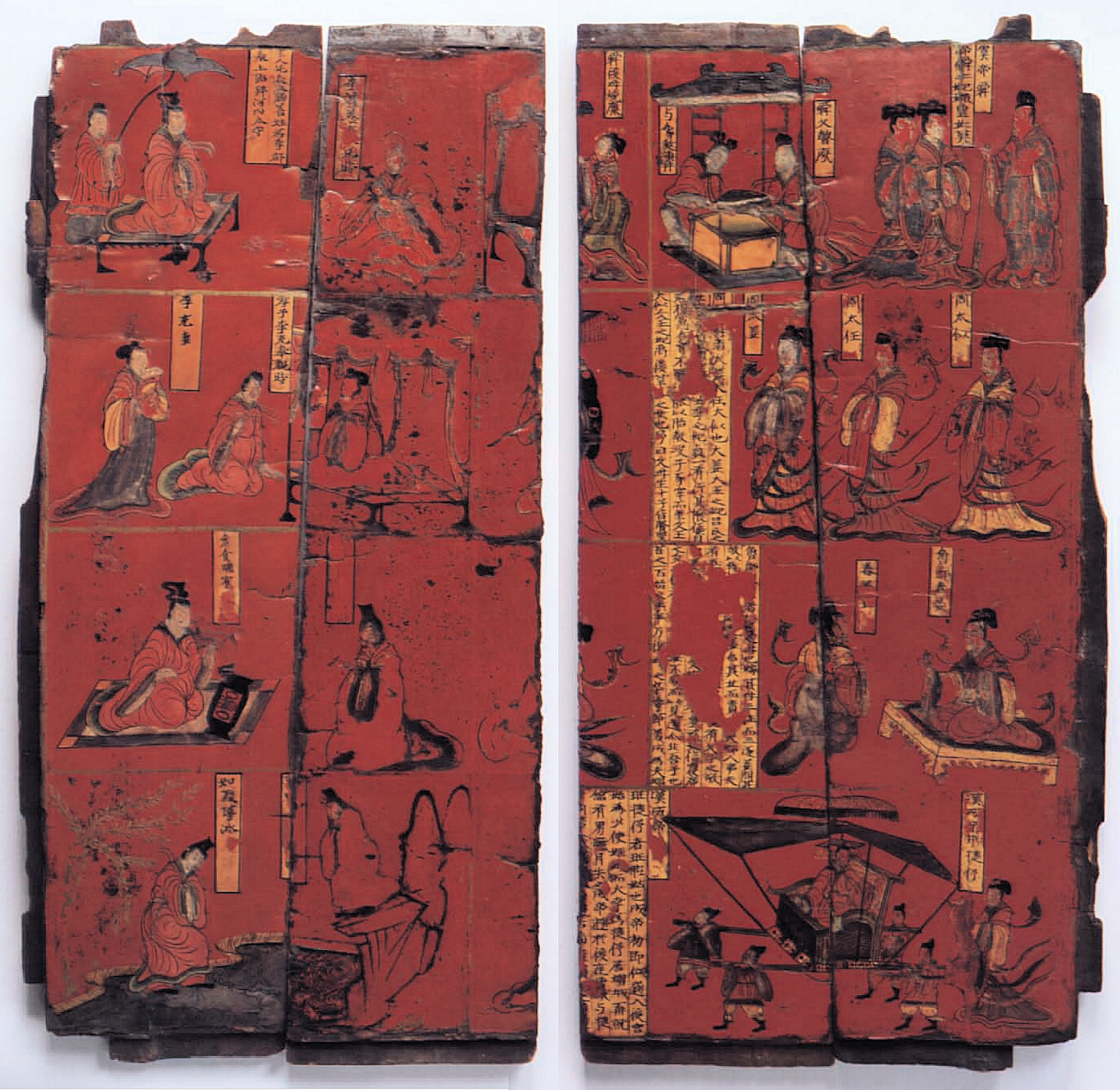
Funerary panels, from the tomb of Sima Jinlong, 484 CE

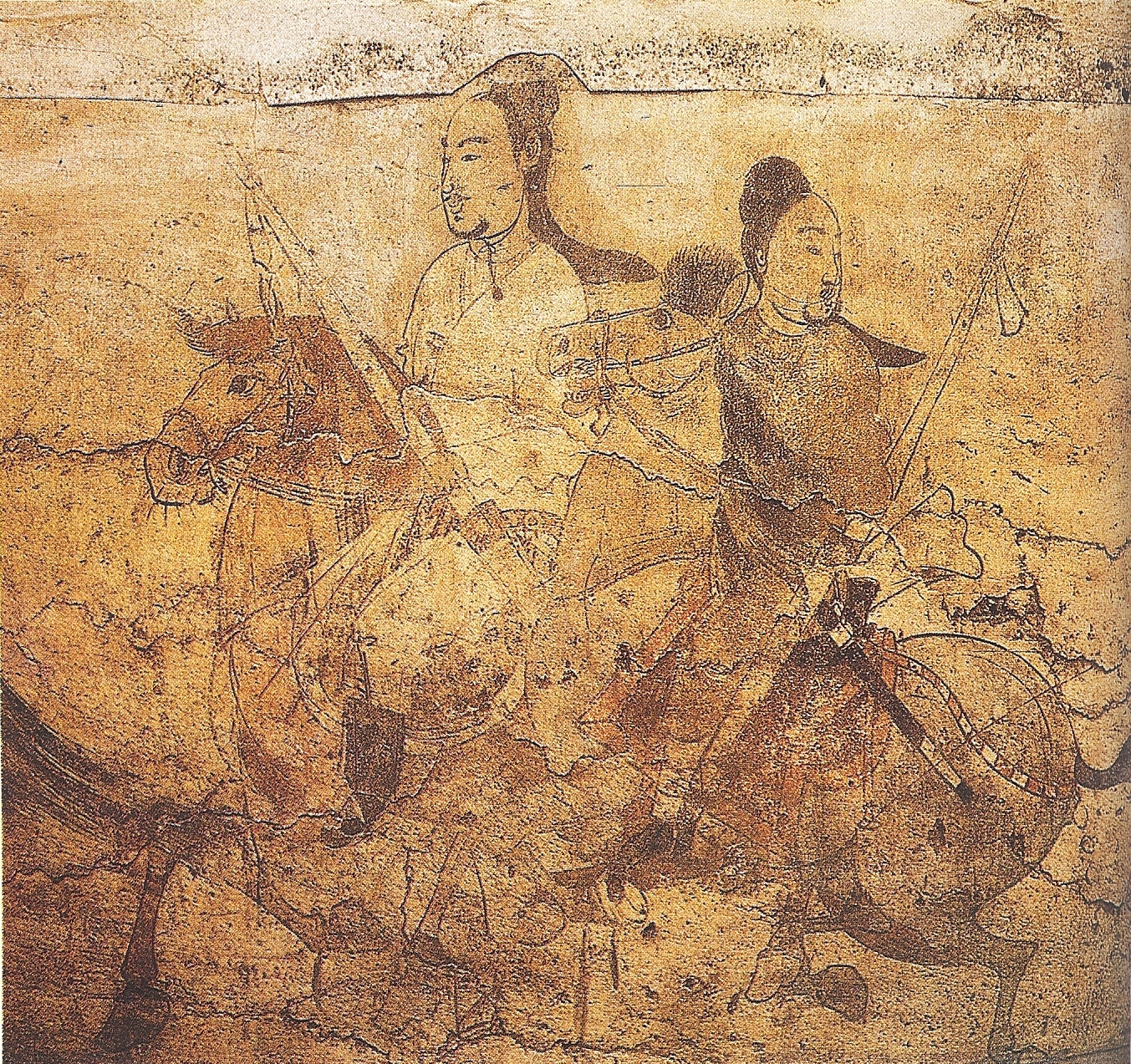
A scene of two horseback riders from a wall painting in the tomb of Lou Rui at Taiyuan, Shanxi, Northern Qi dynasty (550–577)

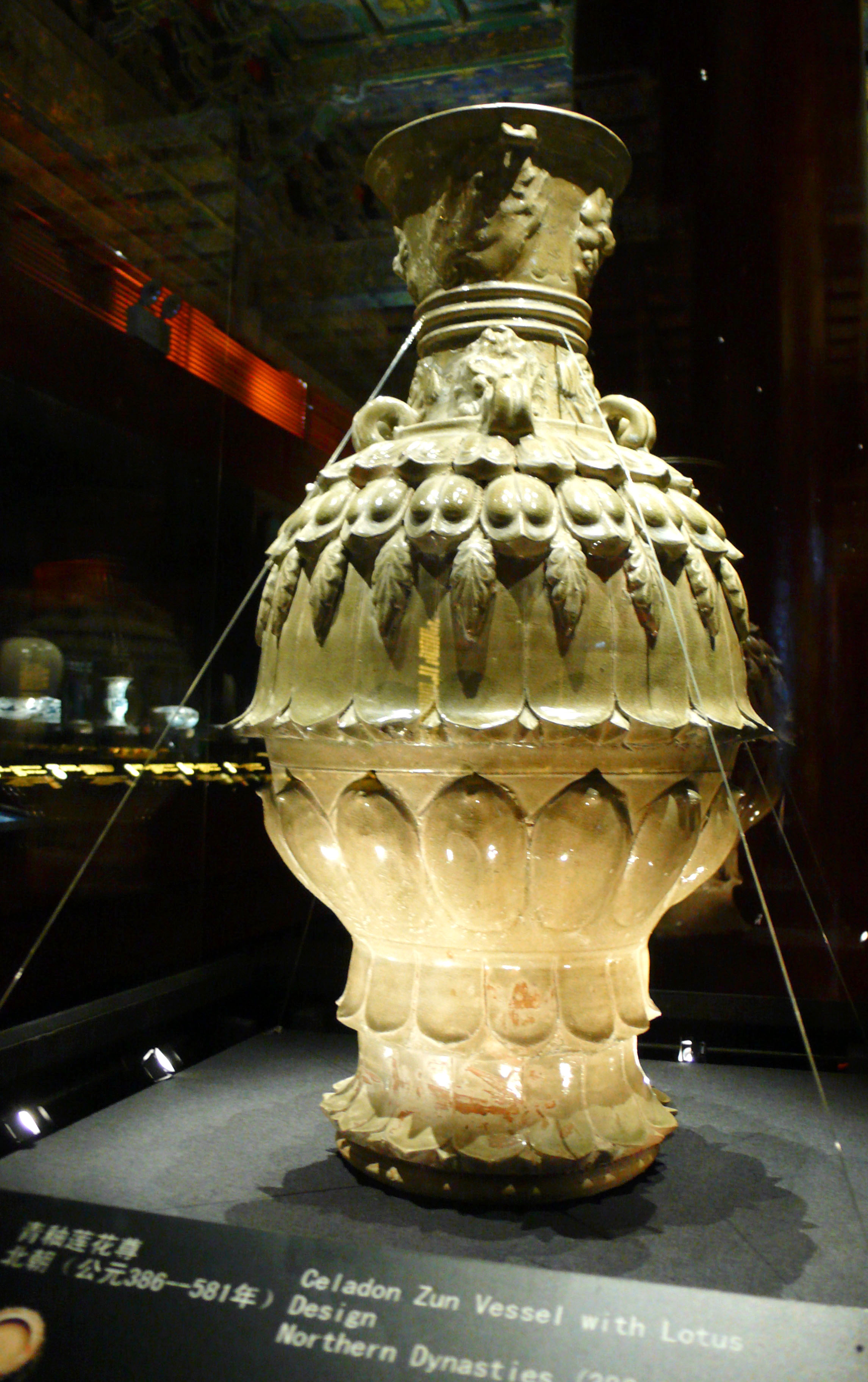
Lotus-patterned vase from Northern Qi, 6th century CE

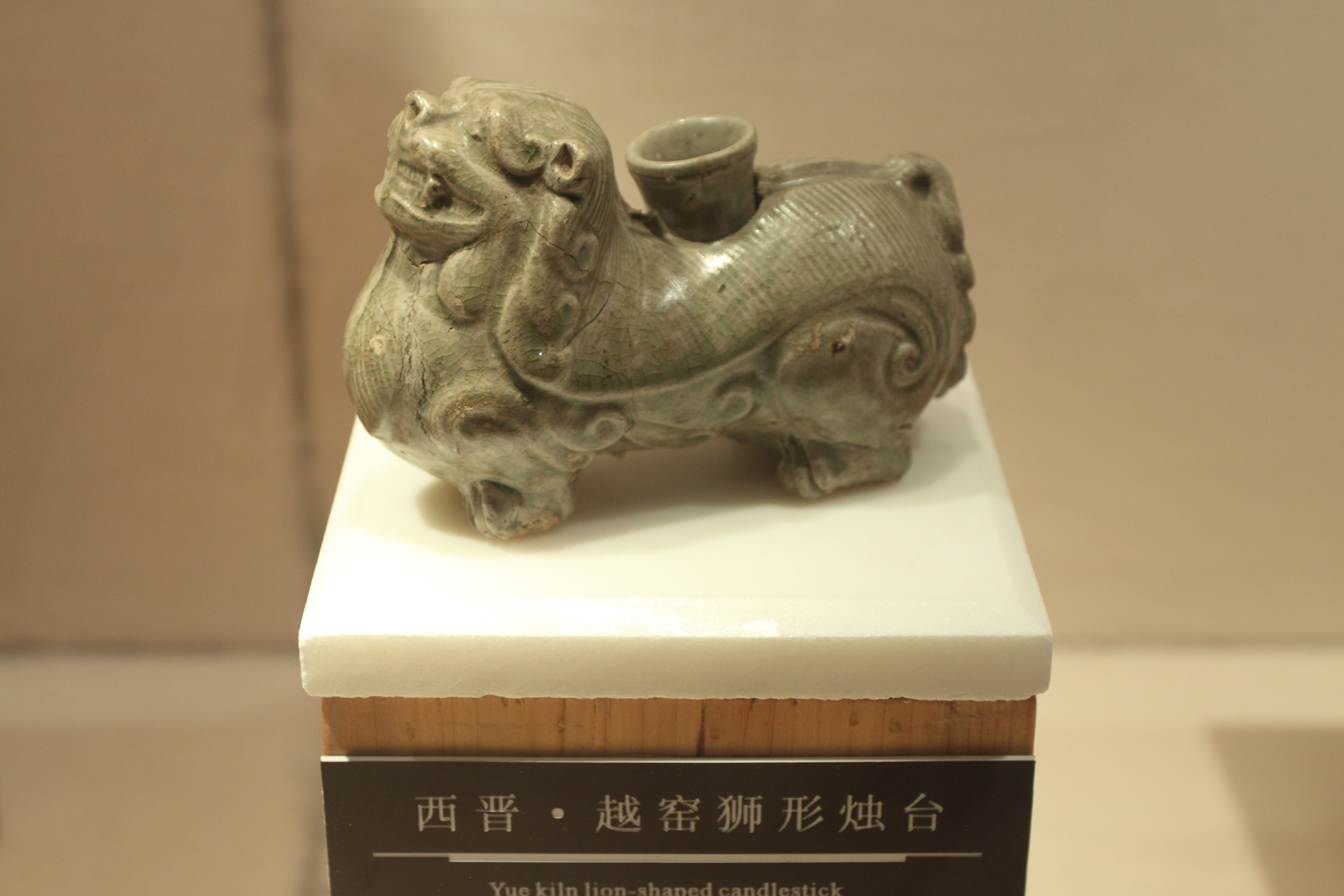
Lion-shaped candle holder from Western Jin c. 4th century CE

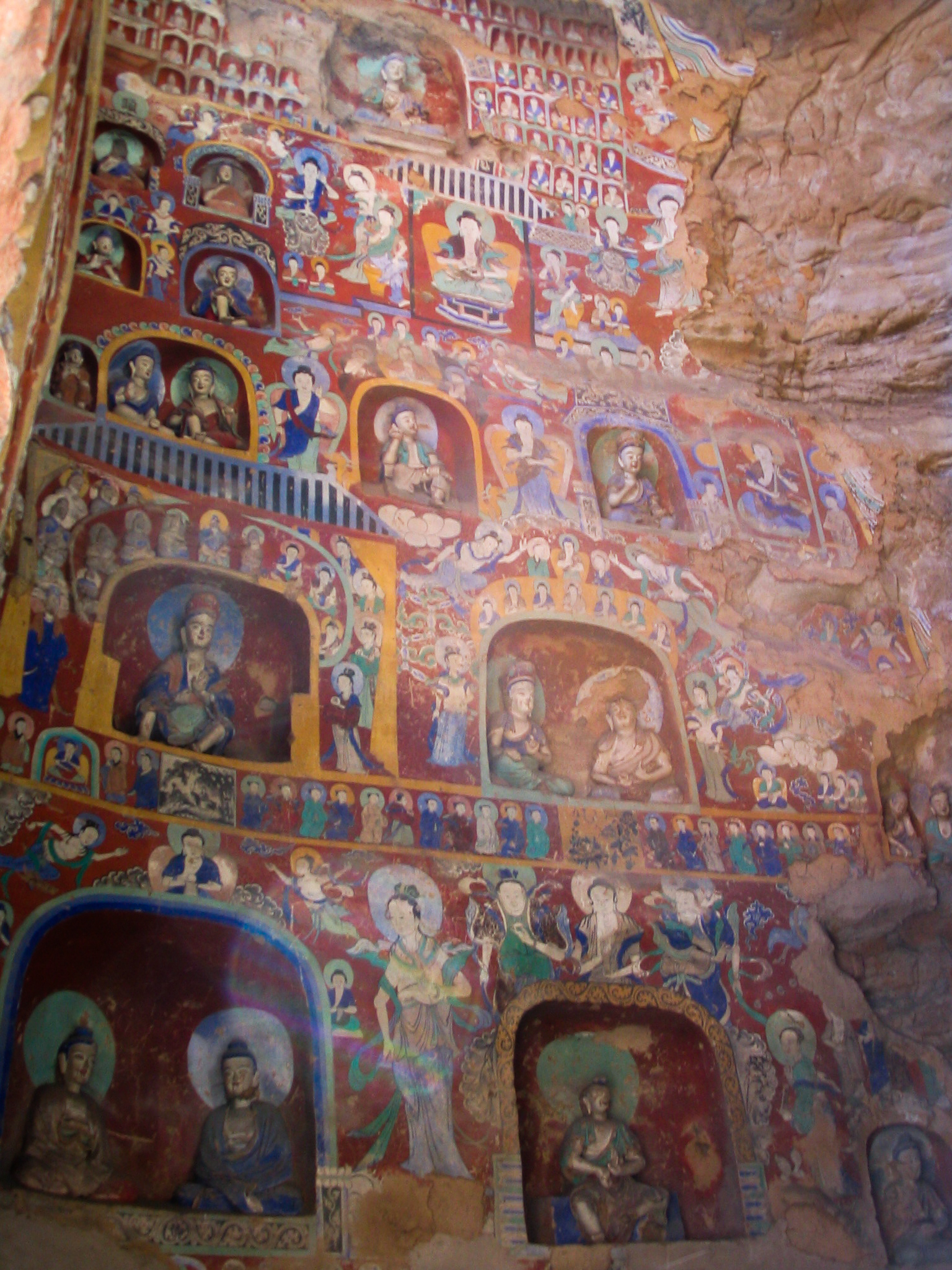
Northern Wei murals and painted figurines from the Yungang Grottoes, dated 5th to 6th centuries.

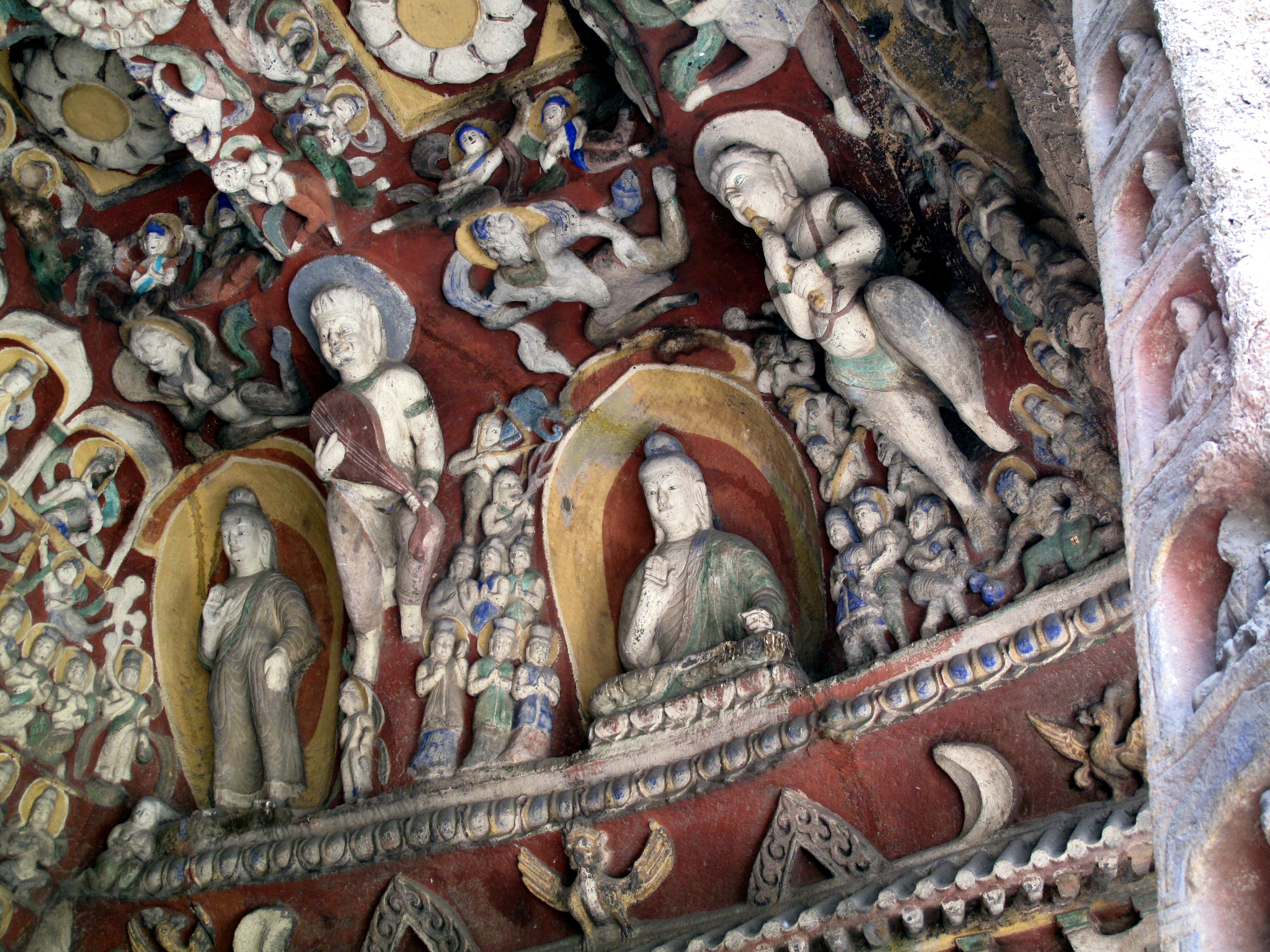

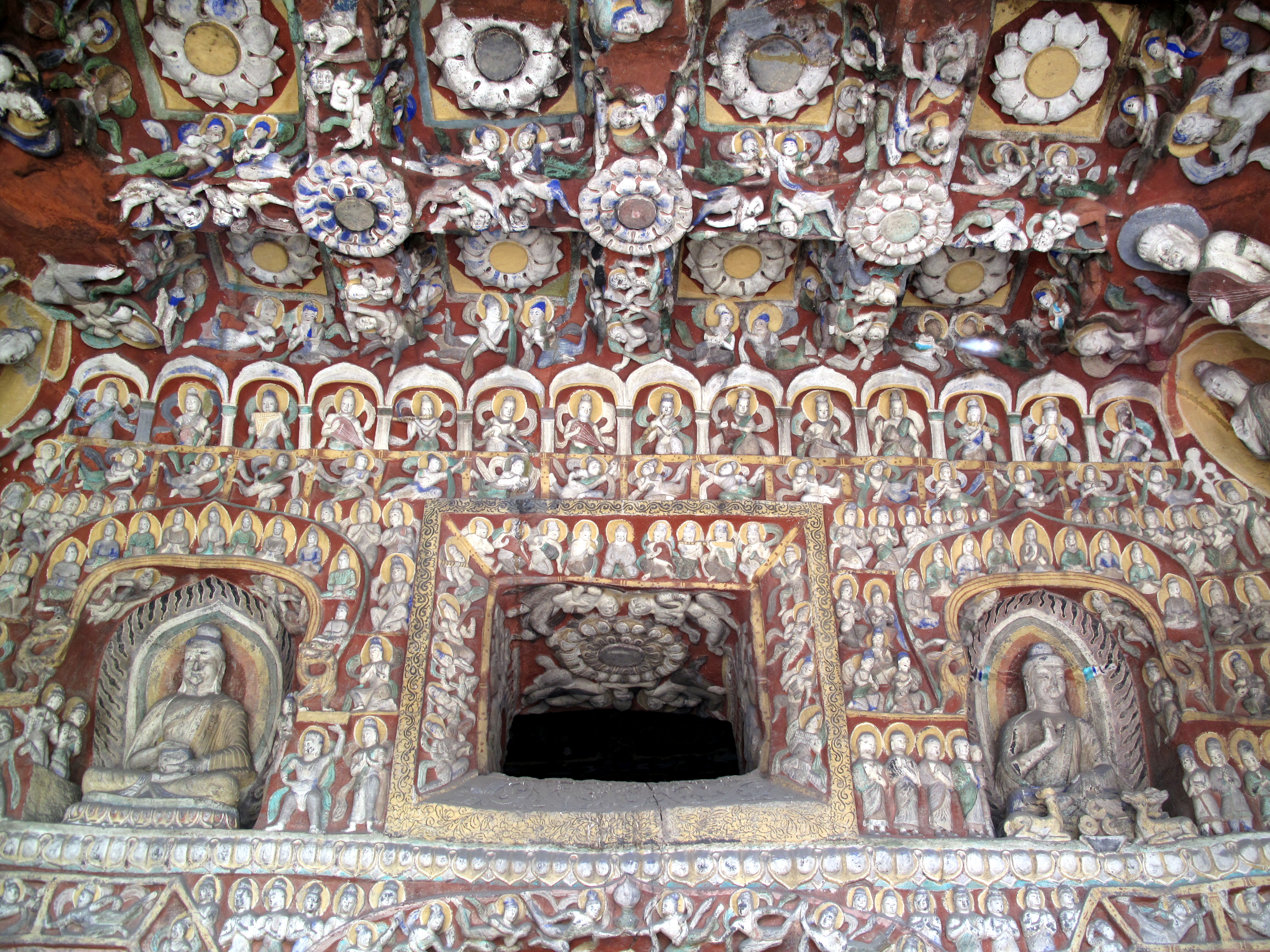

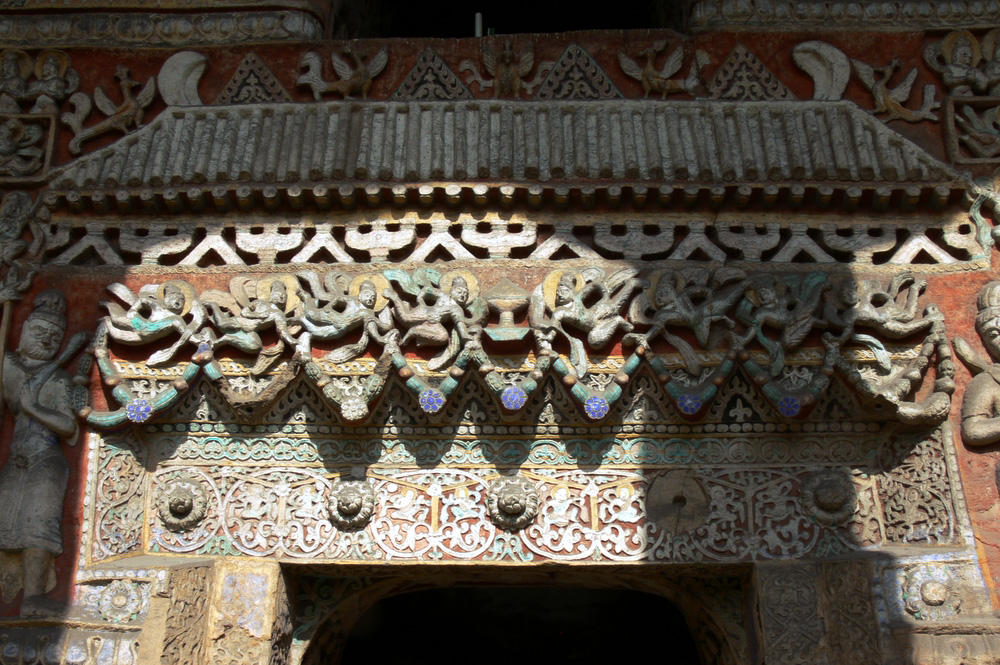

=== The Sui and Tang dynasties (581–960) ===
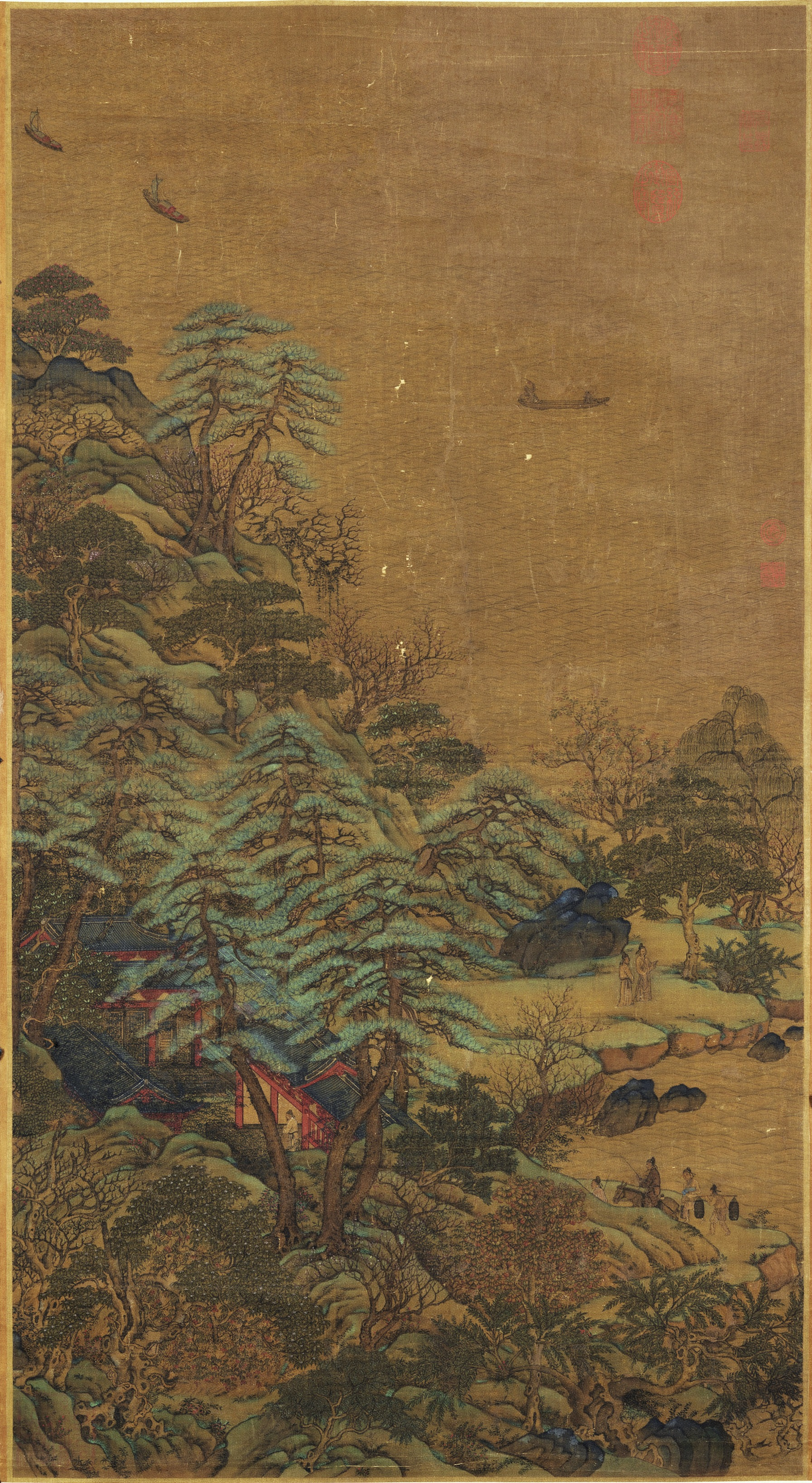
Sailing Boats and a Riverside Mansion, 7th century original by Li Sixun.

==== Buddhist architecture and sculpture ====
Following a transition under the Sui dynasty, Buddhist sculpture of the Tang evolved towards a markedly lifelike expression. As a consequence of the dynasty's openness to foreign trade and influences through the Silk Road, Tang dynasty Buddhist sculpture assumed a rather classical form, inspired by the Greco-Buddhist art of Central Asia.

However, foreign influences came to be negatively perceived towards the end of the Tang dynasty. In the year 845, the Tang emperor Wuzong outlawed all "foreign" religions (including Nestorian Christianity, Zoroastrianism and Buddhism) in order to support indigenous Taoism. He confiscated Buddhist possessions and forced the faith to go underground, therefore affecting the ulterior development of the religion and its arts in China.

Glazed or painted earthenware Tang dynasty tomb figures are famous, and well-represented in museums around the world. Most wooden Tang sculptures have not survived, though representations of the Tang international style can still be seen in Nara, Japan. The longevity of stone sculpture has proved much greater. Some of the finest examples can be seen at Longmen, near Luoyang, Yungang near Datong, and Bingling Temple in Gansu. One of the most famous Buddhist Chinese pagodas is the Giant Wild Goose Pagoda, built in 652 AD.

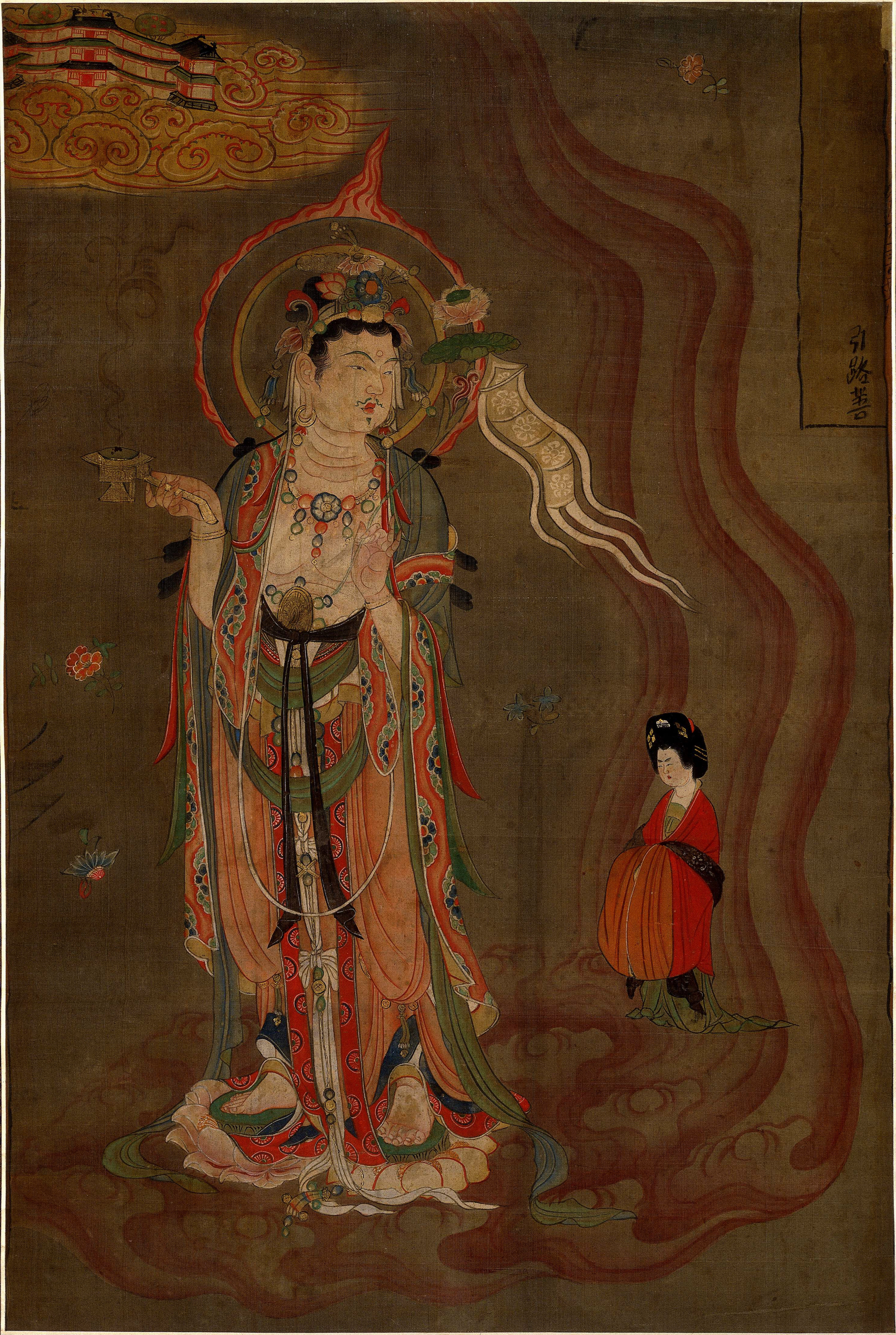
Tang dynasty painting from Dunhuang.

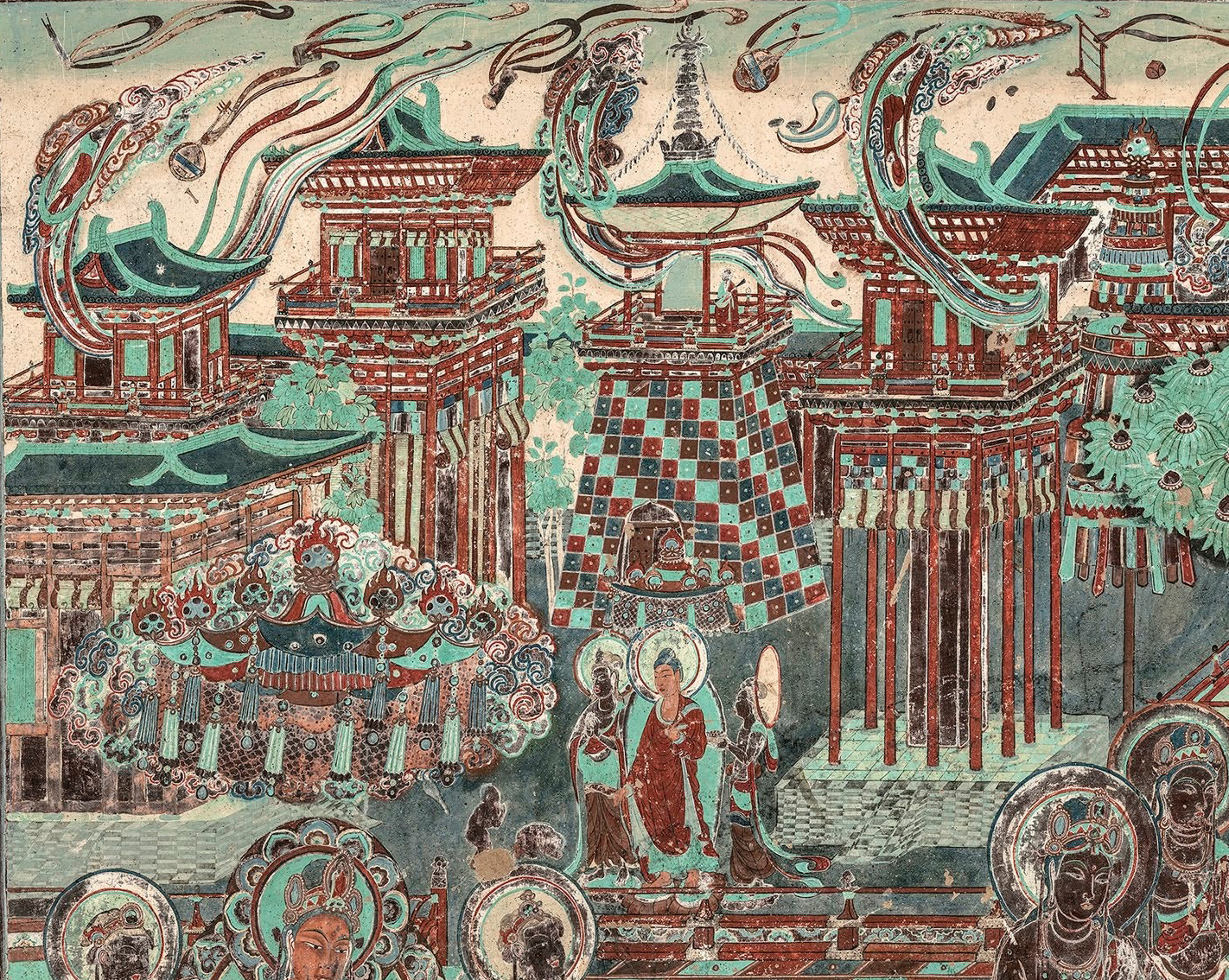
Fresco from Dunhuang depicting typical Tang architecture

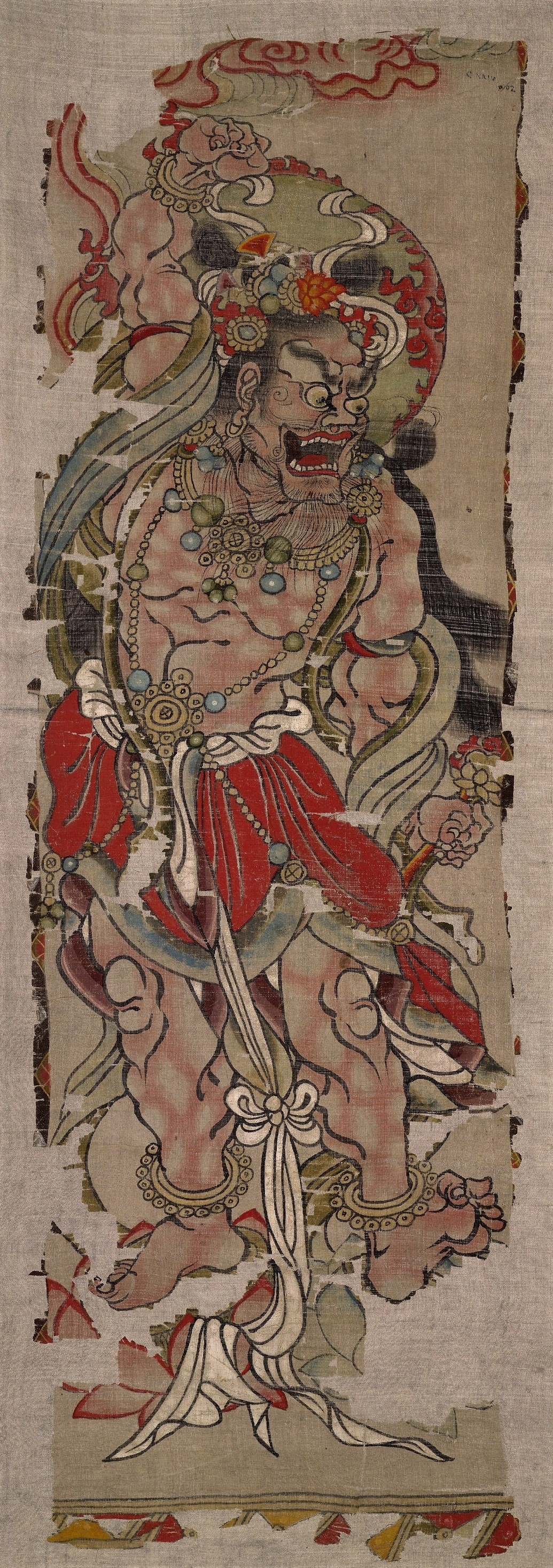
Painting of Varjapani

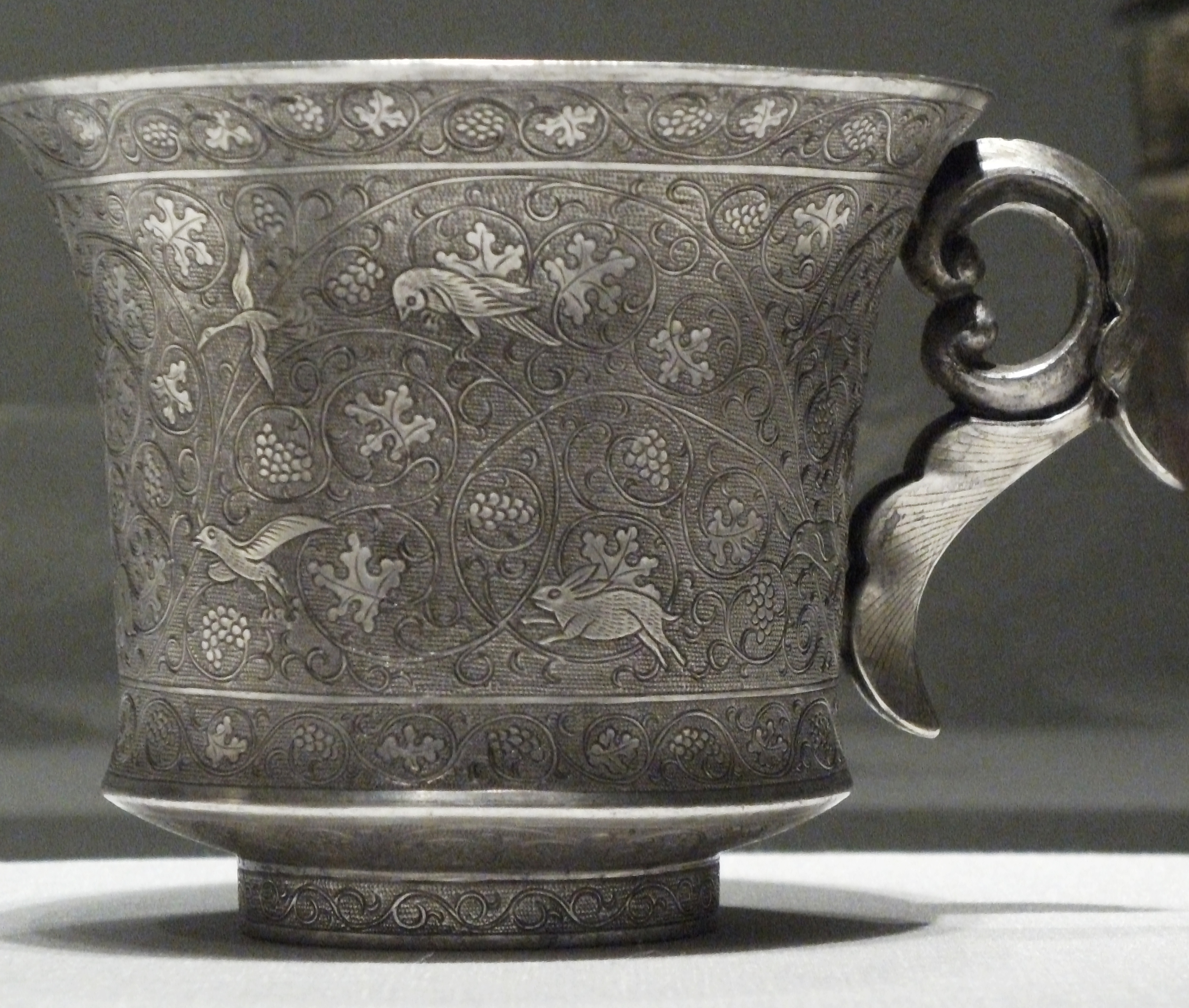
Central Asian influence can be seen in the shape of this cup.
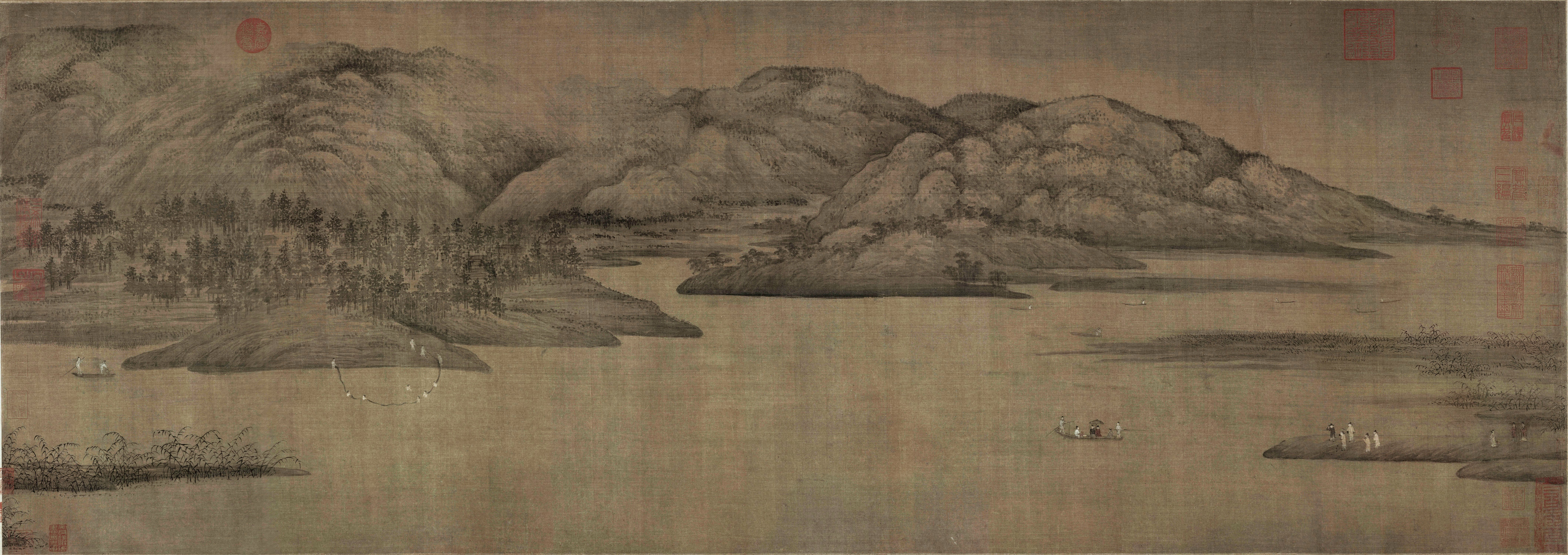
Views of Xiaoxiang by Dong Yuan (932-962). Dong is considered as one of the originators of landscape painting styles; the scales of such paintings were often huge, with minuscule yet intricate pastoralist subjects showing the relative enormity of the landscape. Zoom into the left to see a group of men engaging in seine-haul fishing.

==== Painting ====
Painting by Dong Yuan (c. 934 – 962).

Beginning in the Tang dynasty (618–907), the primary subject matter of painting was the landscape, known as shanshui (mountain water) painting. In these landscapes, usually monochromatic and sparse, the purpose was not to reproduce exactly the appearance of nature but rather to grasp an emotion or atmosphere so as to catch the "rhythm" of nature.

Painting in the traditional style involved essentially the same techniques as calligraphy and was done with a brush dipped in black or colored ink; oils were not used. As with calligraphy, the most popular materials on which paintings were made were paper and silk. The finished works were then mounted on scrolls, which could be hung or rolled up. Traditional painting was also done in albums, on walls, lacquer work, and in other media.

Dong Yuan was an active painter in the Southern Tang Kingdom. He was known for both figure and landscape paintings, and exemplified the elegant style which would become the standard for brush painting in China over the next 900 years. As with many artists in China, his profession was as an official where he studied the existing styles of Li Sixun and Wang Wei. However, he added to the number of techniques, including more sophisticated perspective, use of pointillism and crosshatching to build up vivid effect.

Zhan Ziqian was a painter during the Sui dynasty. His only painting in existence is Strolling About In Spring arranged mountains perspectively. Because pure landscape paintings are hardly seen in Europe until the 17th century, Strolling About In Spring may well be the world's first landscape painting.

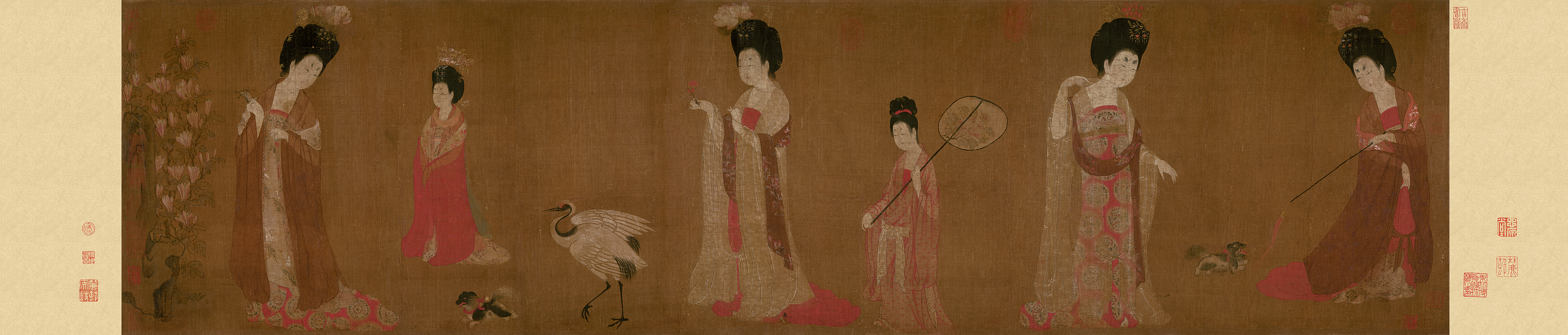
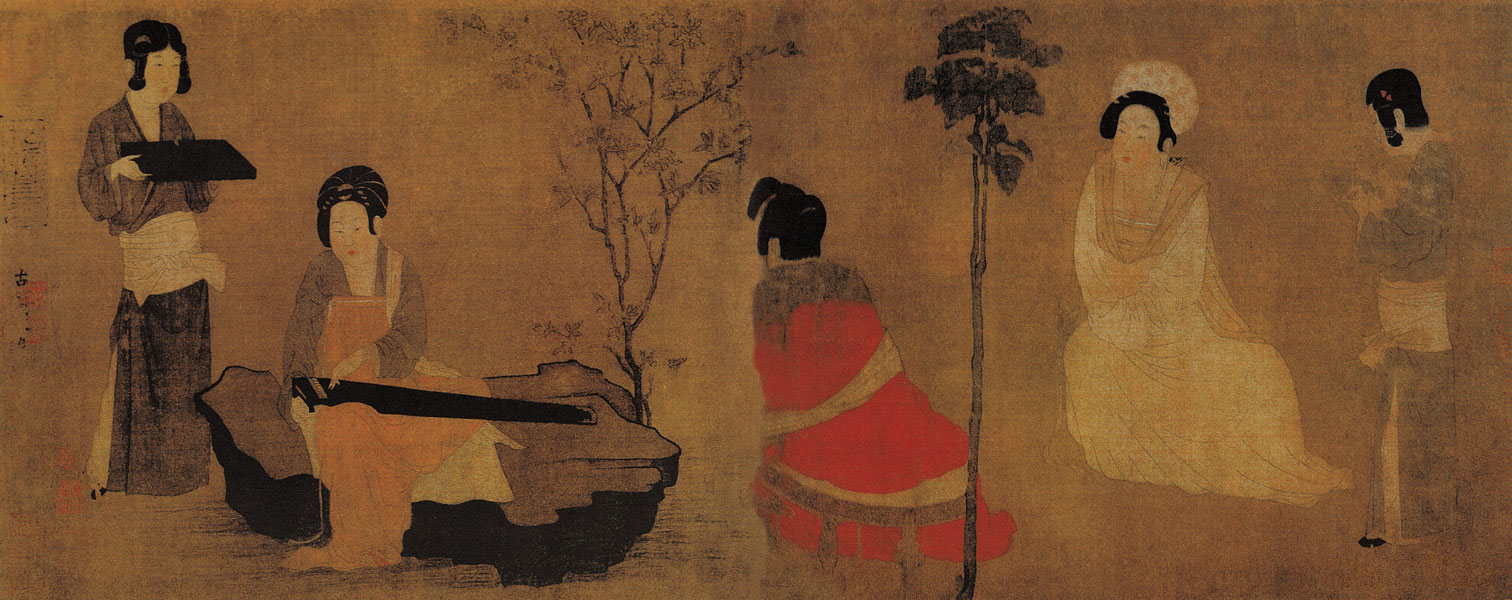
Zhou Fang (c.730-800) is renowned for his paintings of contemporary court ladies, whose opulent figures reflected the beauty standards of the day.

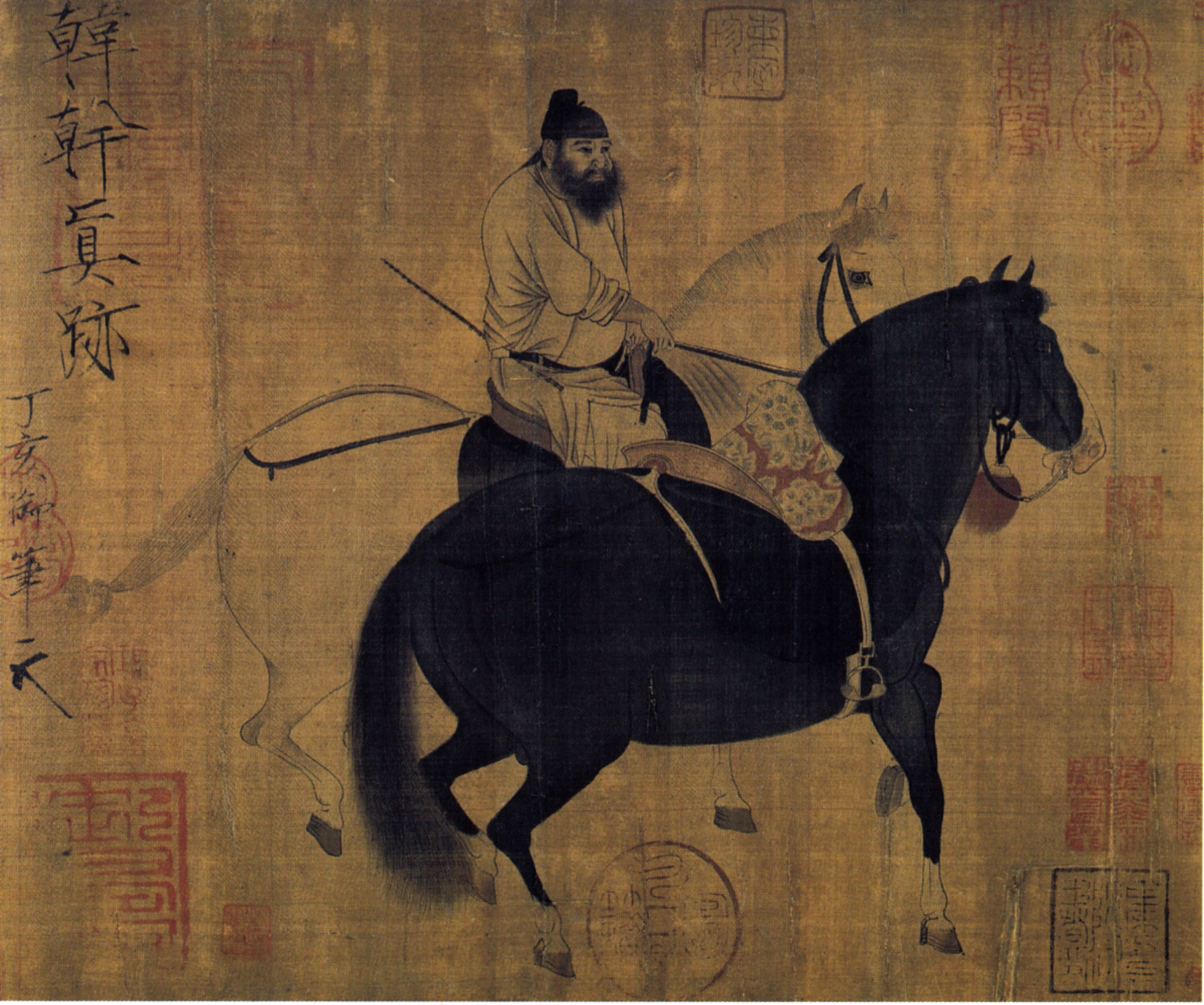
A Man Herding Horses, by Han Gan (706–783 AD), Tang dynasty original.

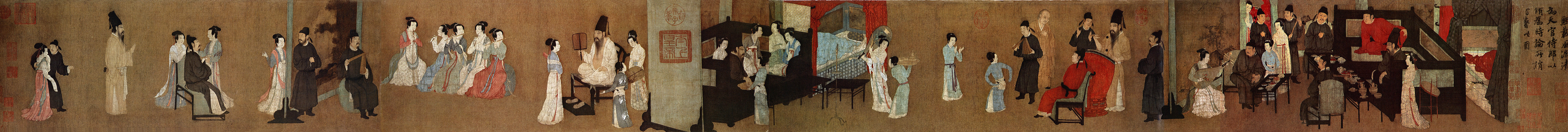
Full scroll of The Night Revels of Han Xizai, first painted in the 10th century in Southern Tang, later reproduced in 12th-century

=== The Song and Yuan dynasties (960–1368) ===
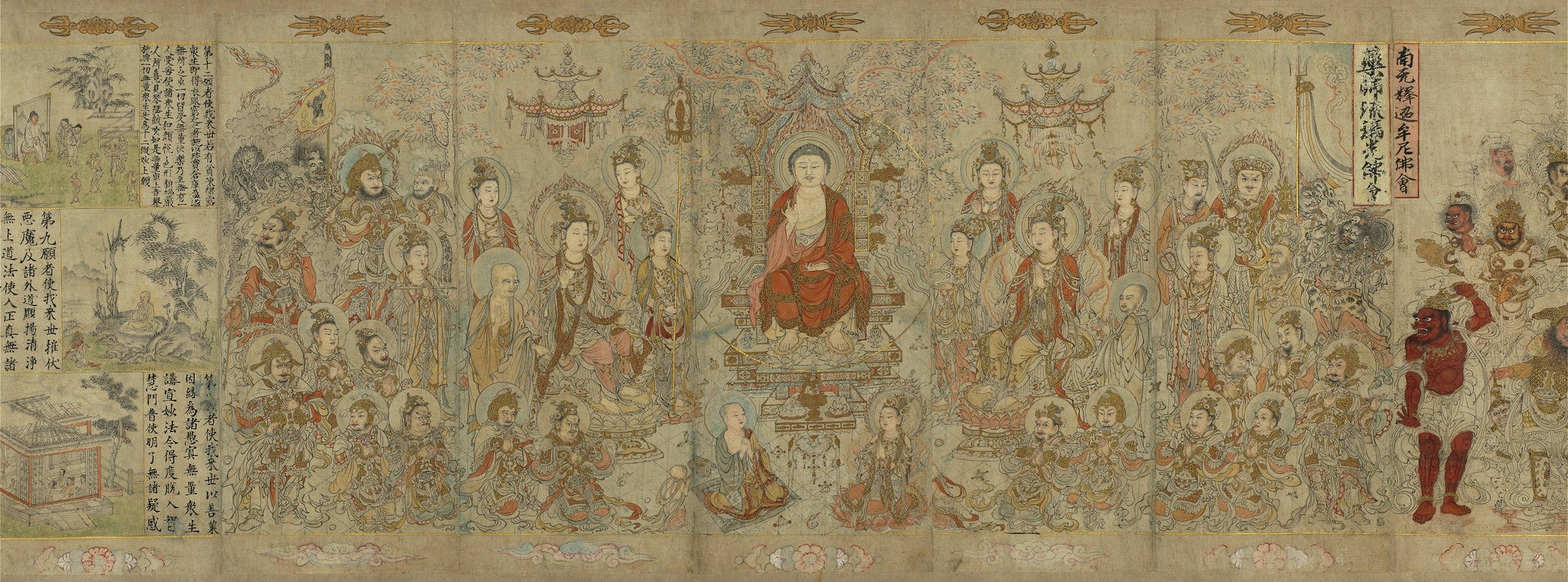
The Sakyamuni Buddha, by Zhang Shengwen, 1173–1176 AD, Song dynasty period.

==== Song painting ====
During the Song dynasty (960–1279), landscapes of more subtle expression appeared; immeasurable distances were conveyed through the use of blurred outlines, mountain contours disappearing into the mist, and impressionistic treatment of natural phenomena. Emphasis was placed on the spiritual qualities of the painting and on the ability of the artist to reveal the inner harmony of man and nature, as perceived according to Taoist and Buddhist concepts.

Liang Kai was a Chinese painter who lived in the 13th century (Song dynasty). He called himself "Madman Liang", and he spent his life drinking and painting. Eventually, he retired and became a Zen monk. Liang is credited with inventing the Zen school of Chinese art. Wen Tong was a painter who lived in the 11th century. He was famous for ink paintings of bamboo. He could hold two brushes in one hand and paint two different distanced bamboos simultaneously. He did not need to see the bamboo while he painted them because he had seen a lot of them.

Zhang Zeduan was a notable painter for his horizontal Along the River During the Qingming Festival landscape and cityscape painting. It is considered one of China's most renowned paintings and has had many well-known remakes throughout Chinese history. Other famous paintings include The Night Revels of Han Xizai, originally painted by the Southern Tang artist Gu Hongzhong in the 10th century, while the well-known version of his painting is a 12th-century remake of the Song dynasty. This is a large horizontal handscroll of a domestic scene showing men of the gentry class being entertained by musicians and dancers while enjoying food, beverage, and wash basins provided by maidservants. In 2000, the modern artist Wang Qingsong created a parody of this painting with a long, horizontal photograph of people in modern clothing making similar facial expressions, poses, and hand gestures as the original painting.

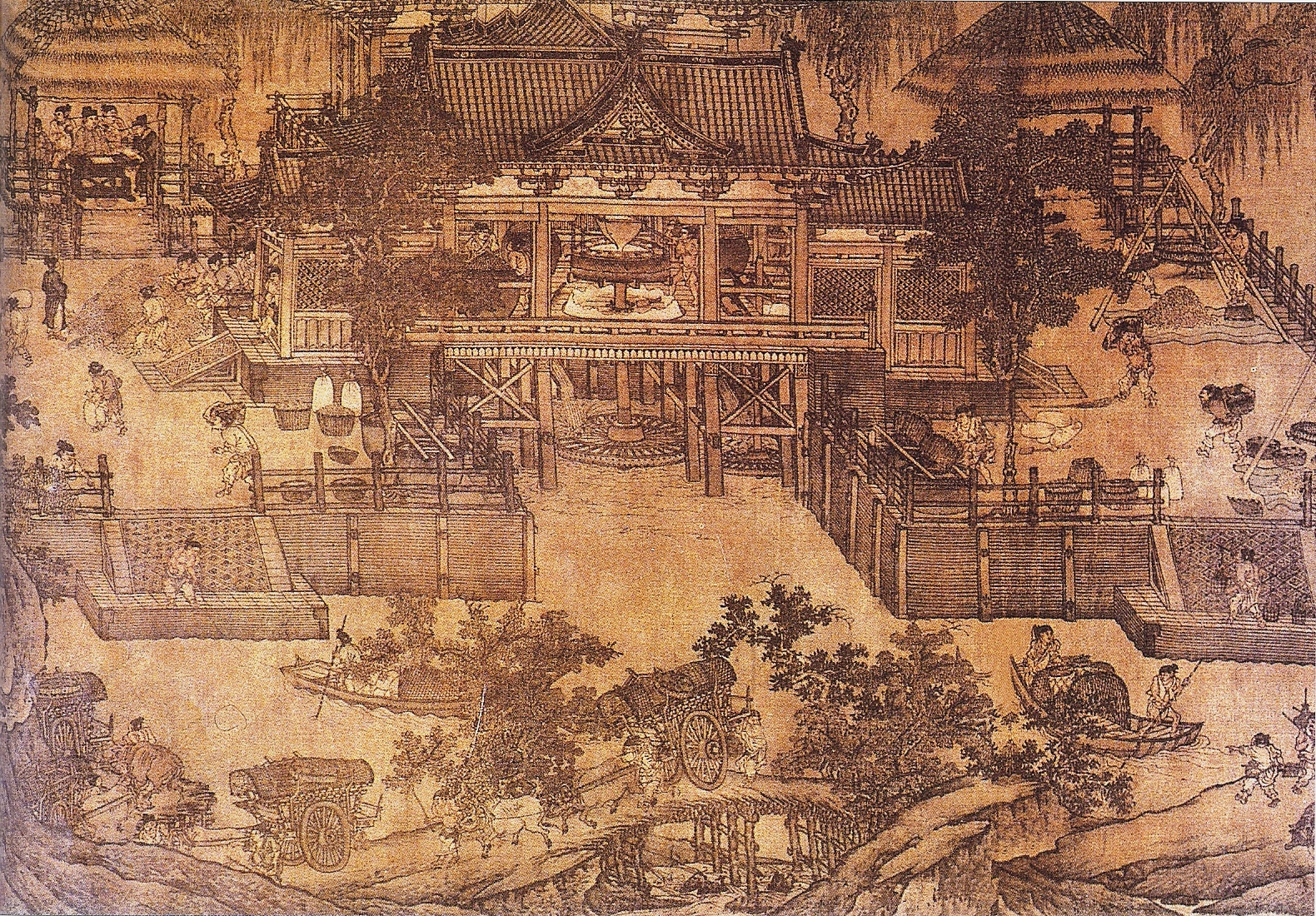
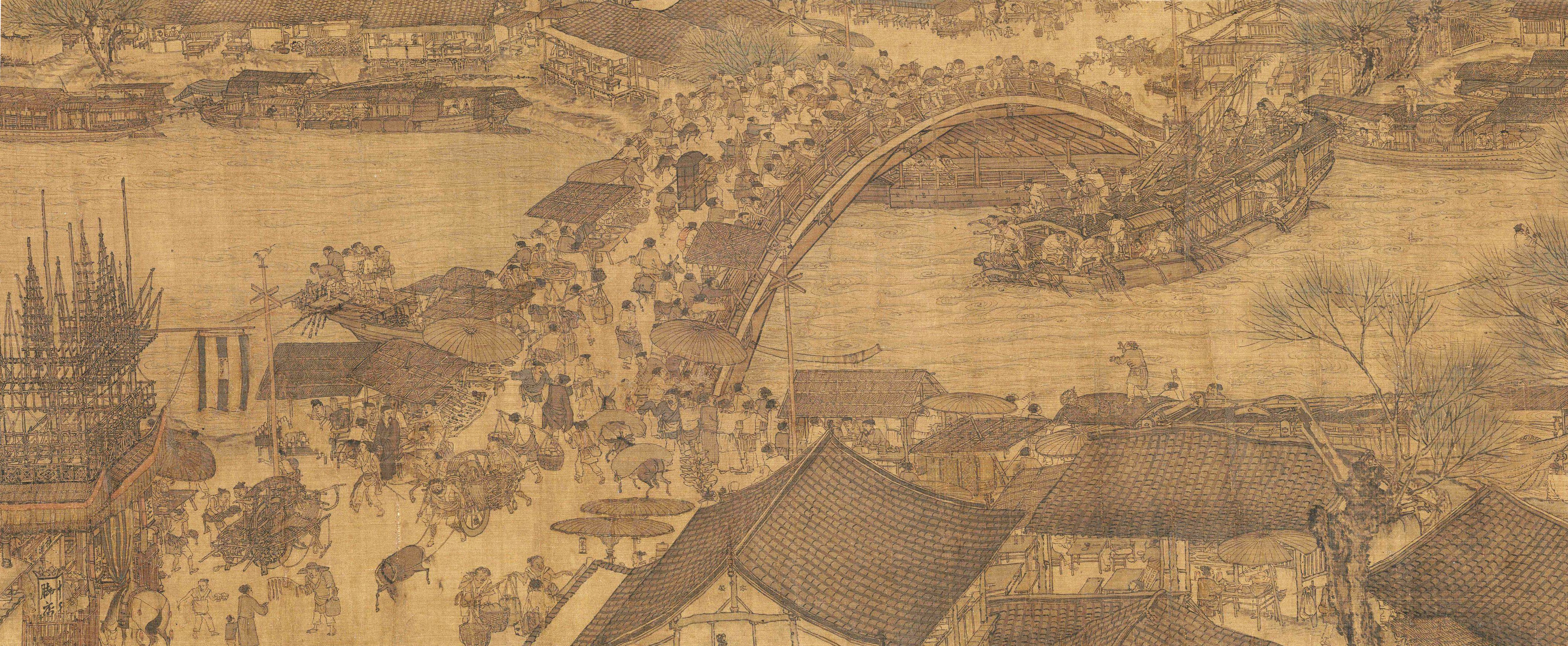
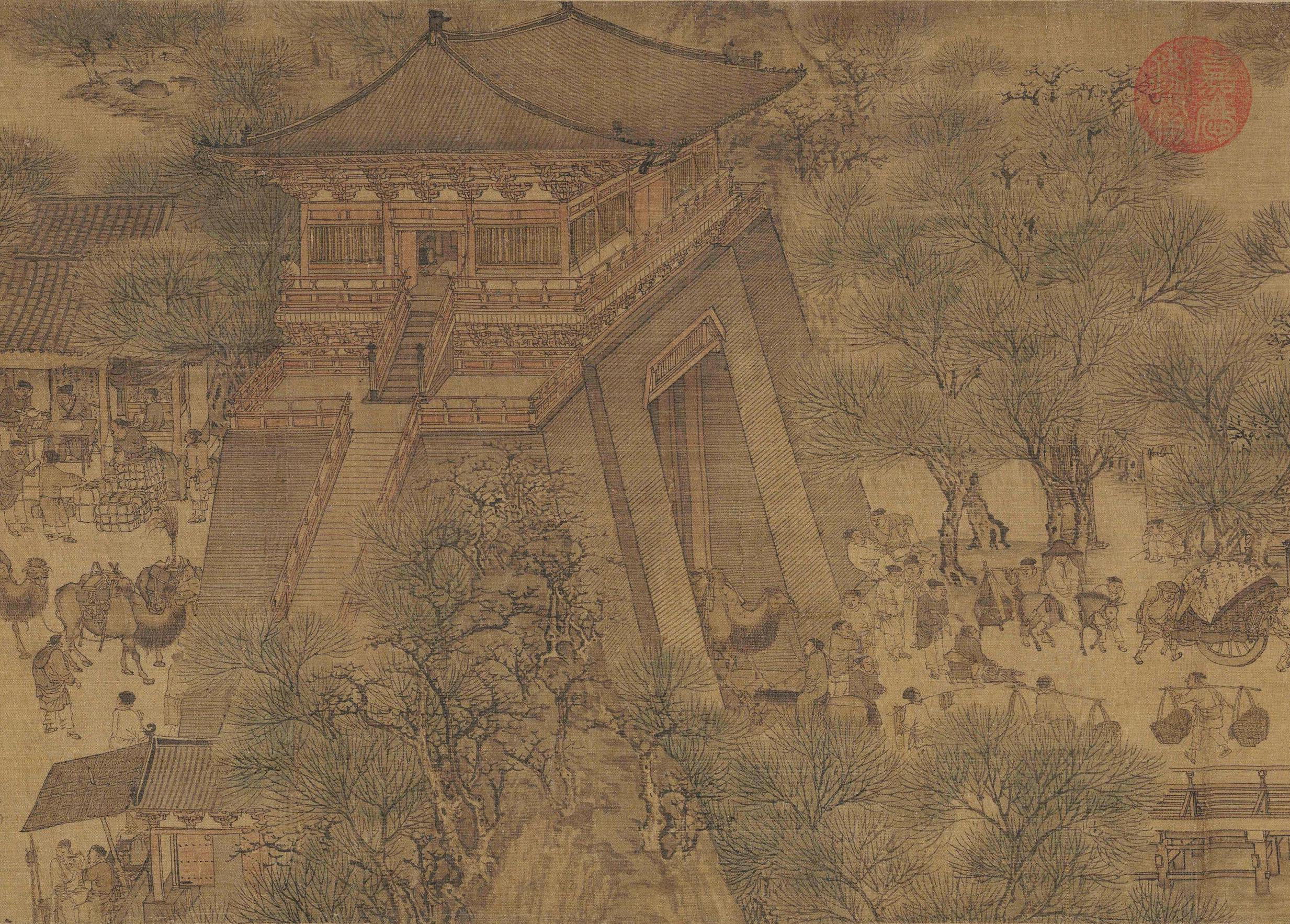
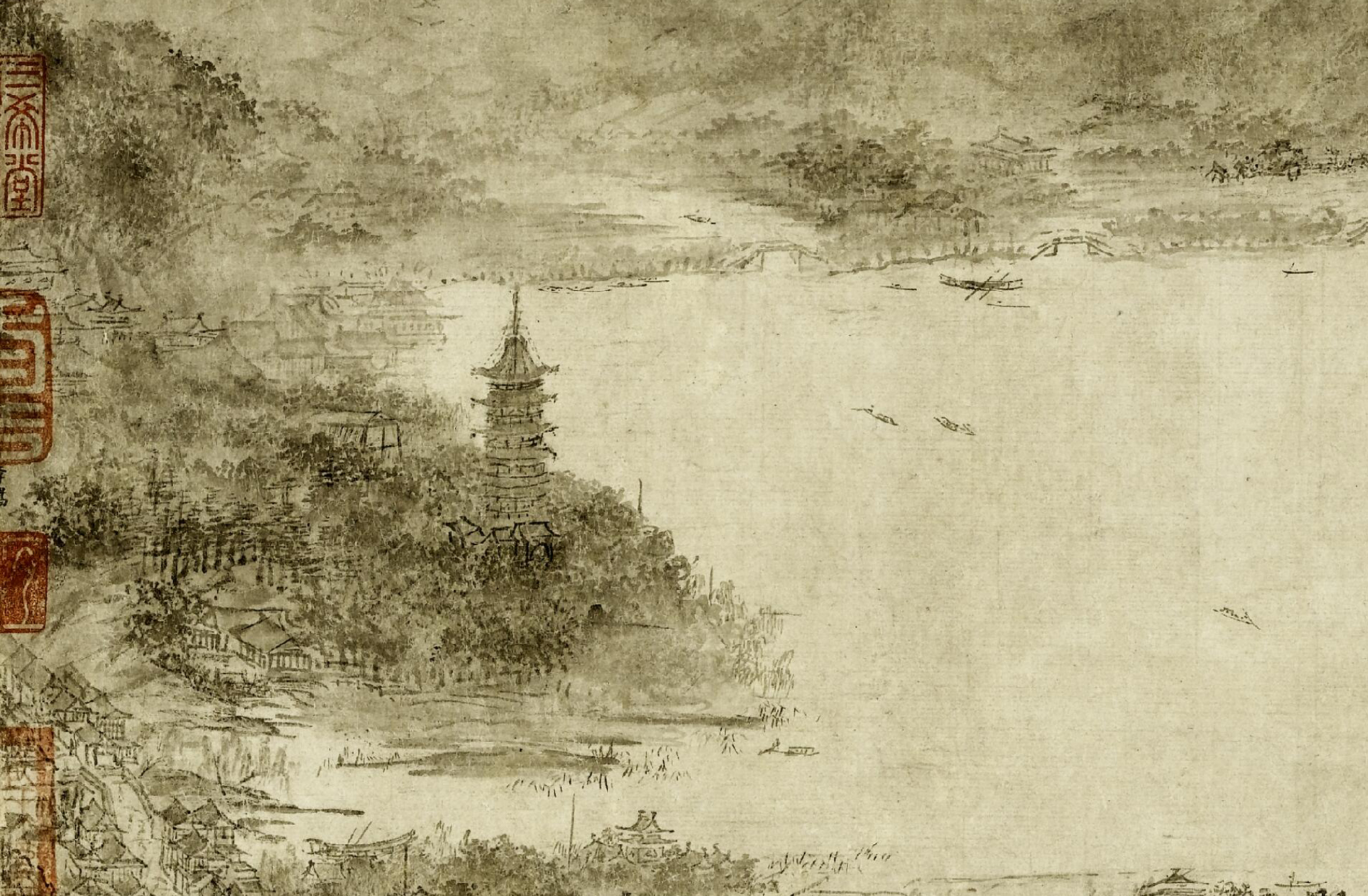
Various scenes from Along the River During the Qingming Festival

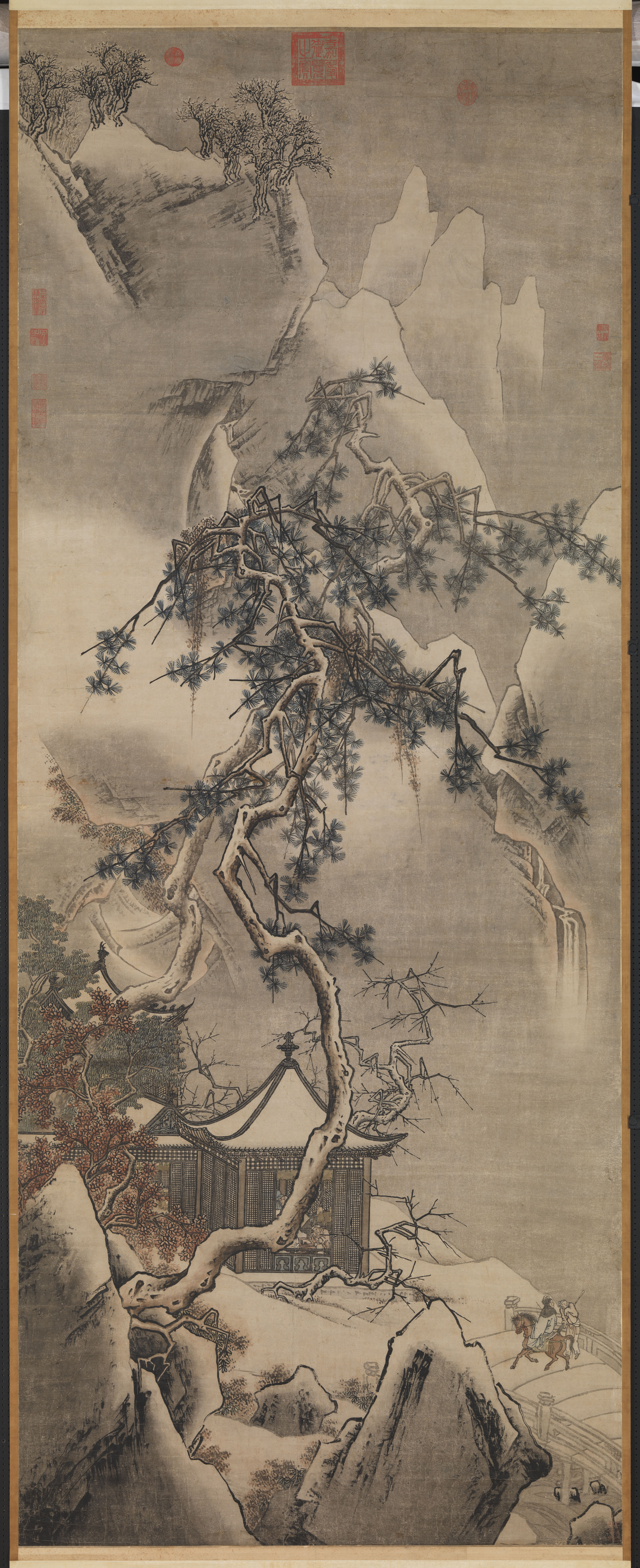
Ma Yuan's Snowscape

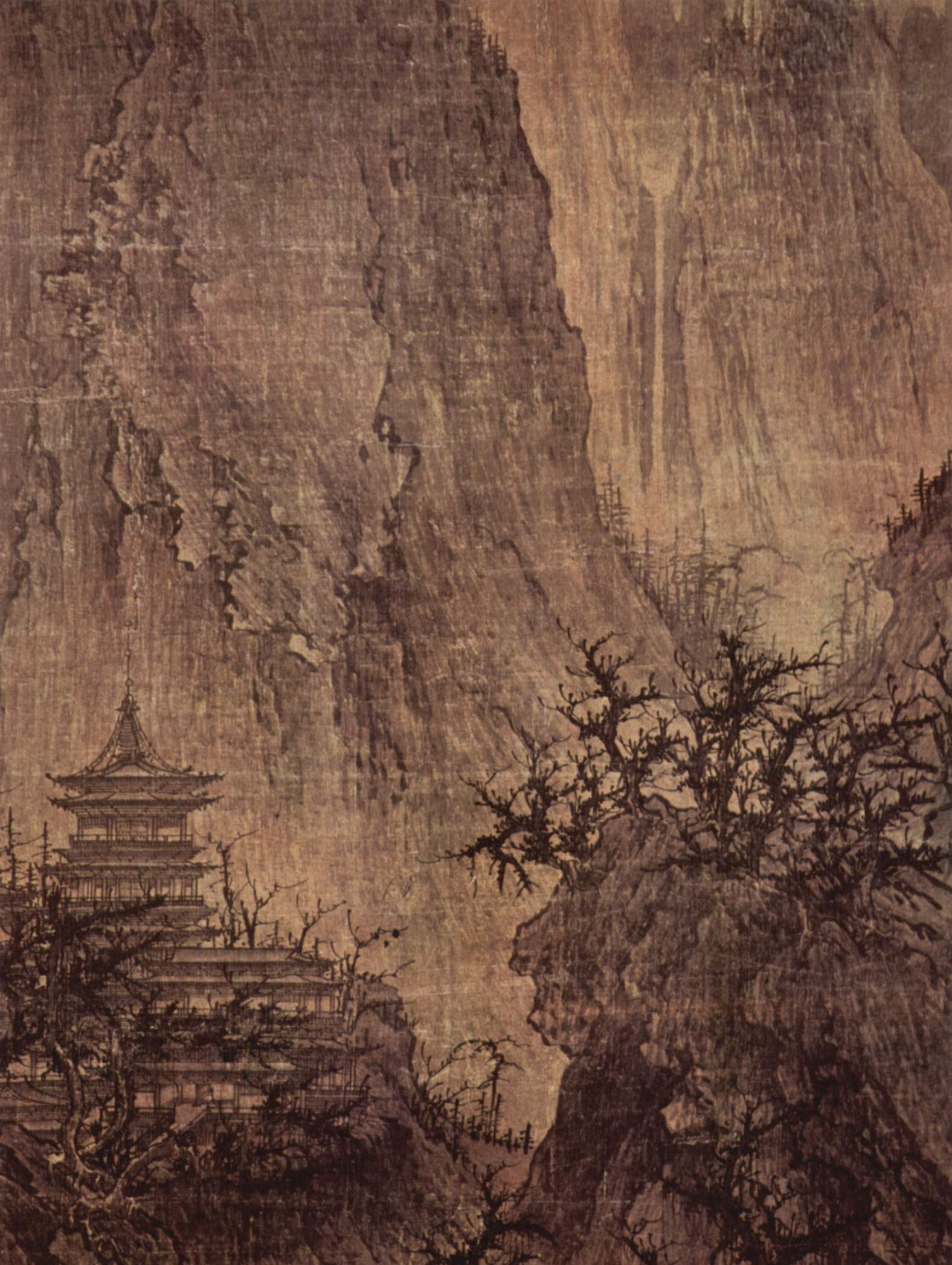
Buddhist Temple in the Mountains, 11th century, ink on silk, Nelson-Atkins Museum of Art, Kansas City (Missouri).

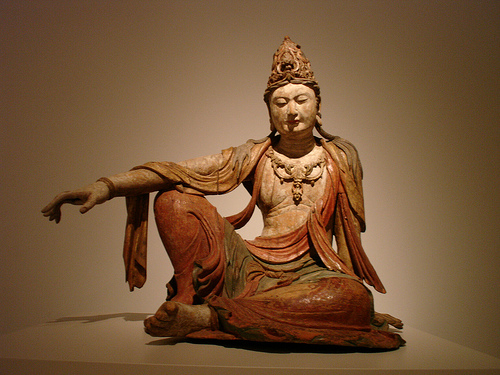
Seated Bodhisattva Avalokitesvara (Guanyin), wood and pigment, 11th century, Chinese Northern Song dynasty, St. Louis Art Museum

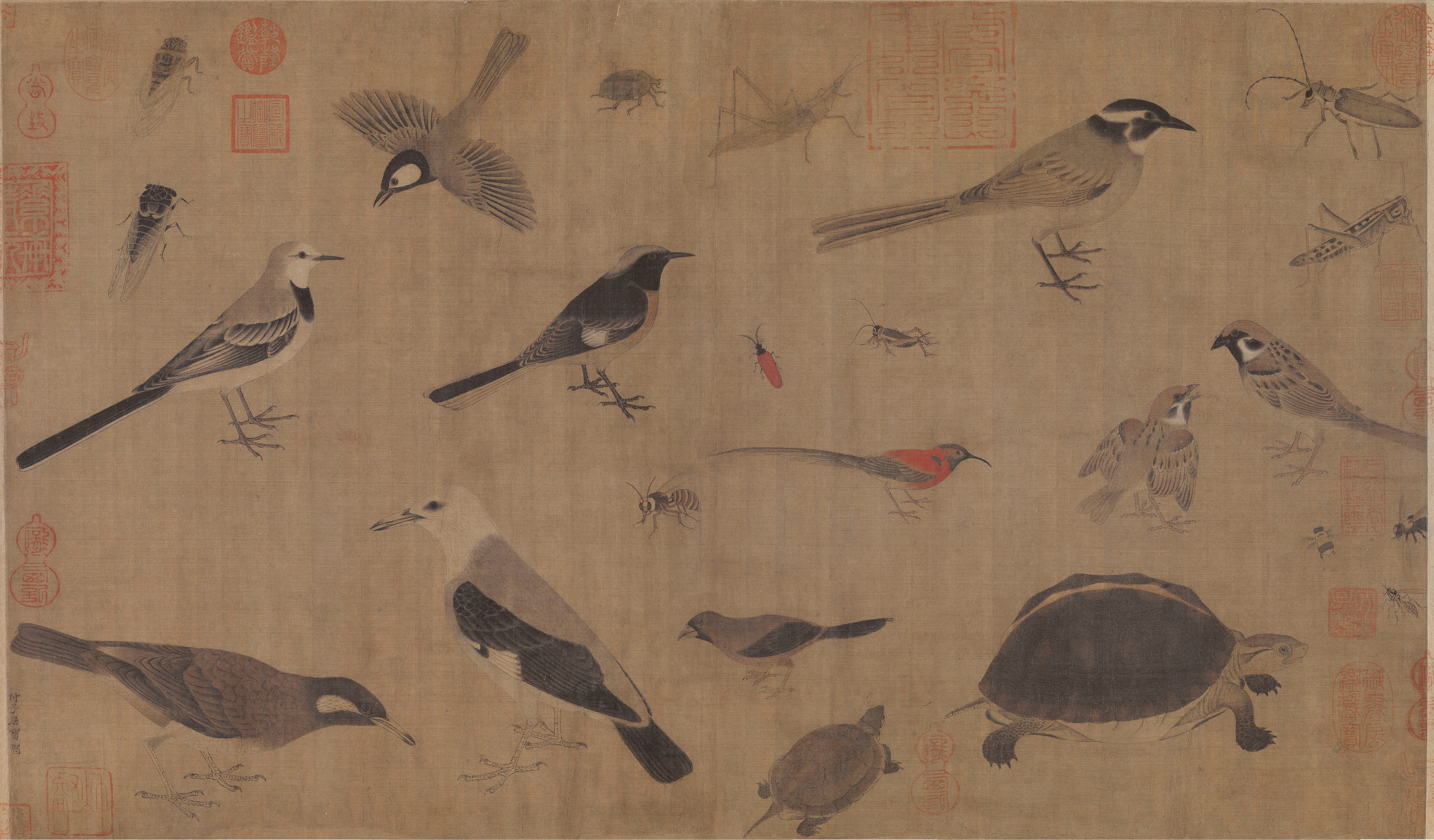
Almanac of birds and beasts, typical example of the Gongbi styles popular during the Song

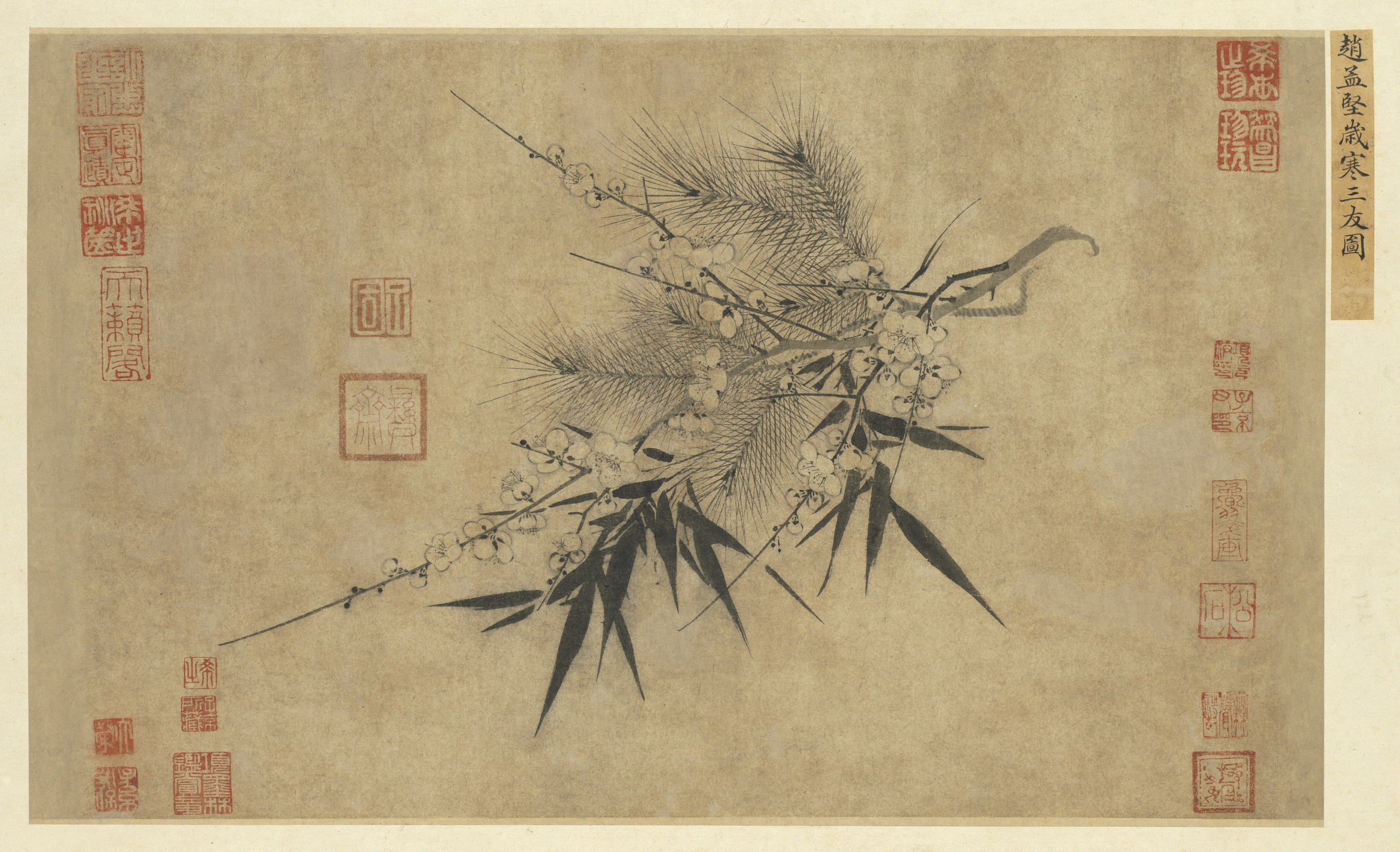
Three Friends of Winter depicting plum, pine and bamboo, still used for decoration during new year's by countries in the sinosphere

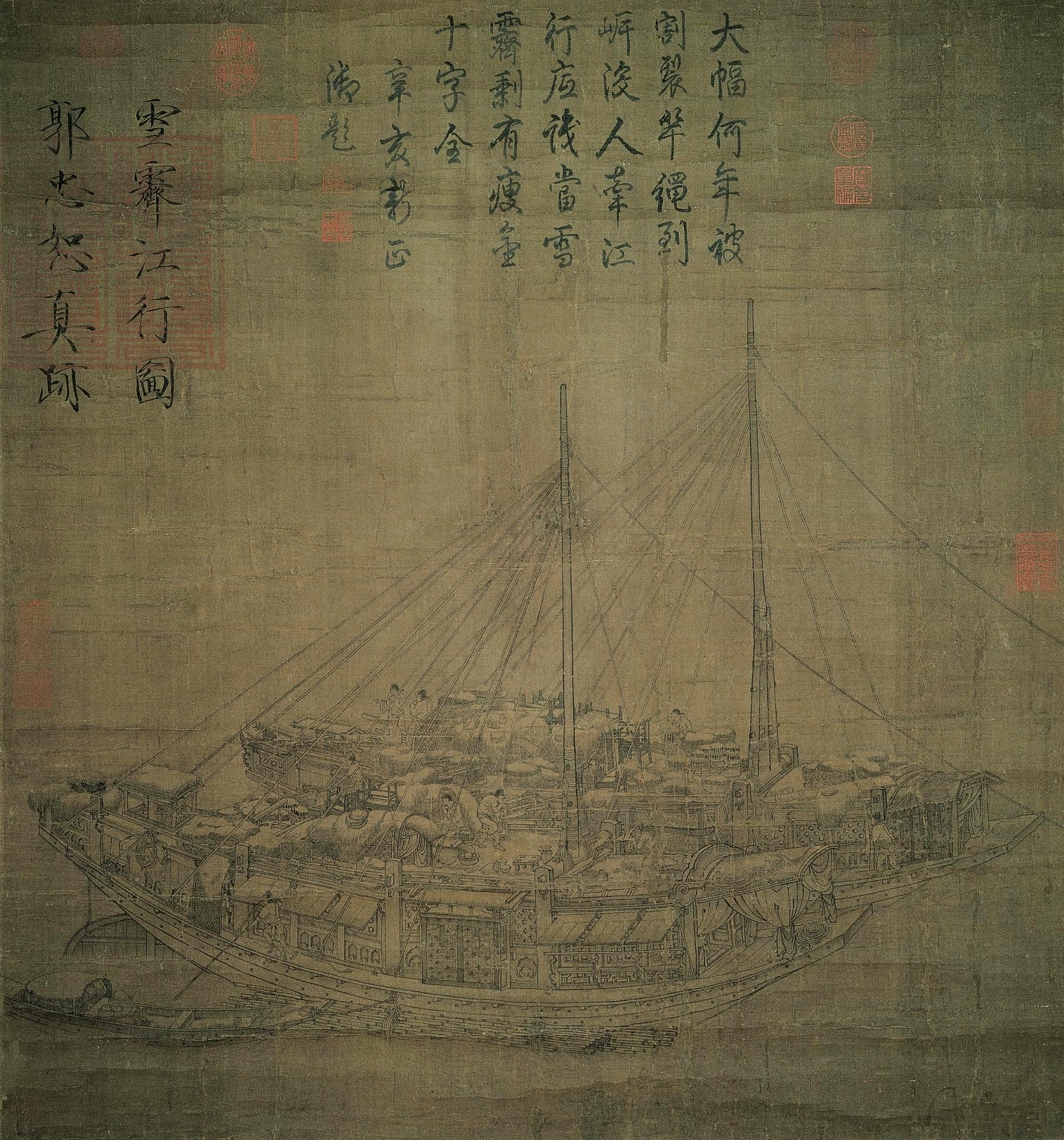
Traveling on the River in Snow. Extremely intricate details give historians insight into medieval Chinese shipbuilding.

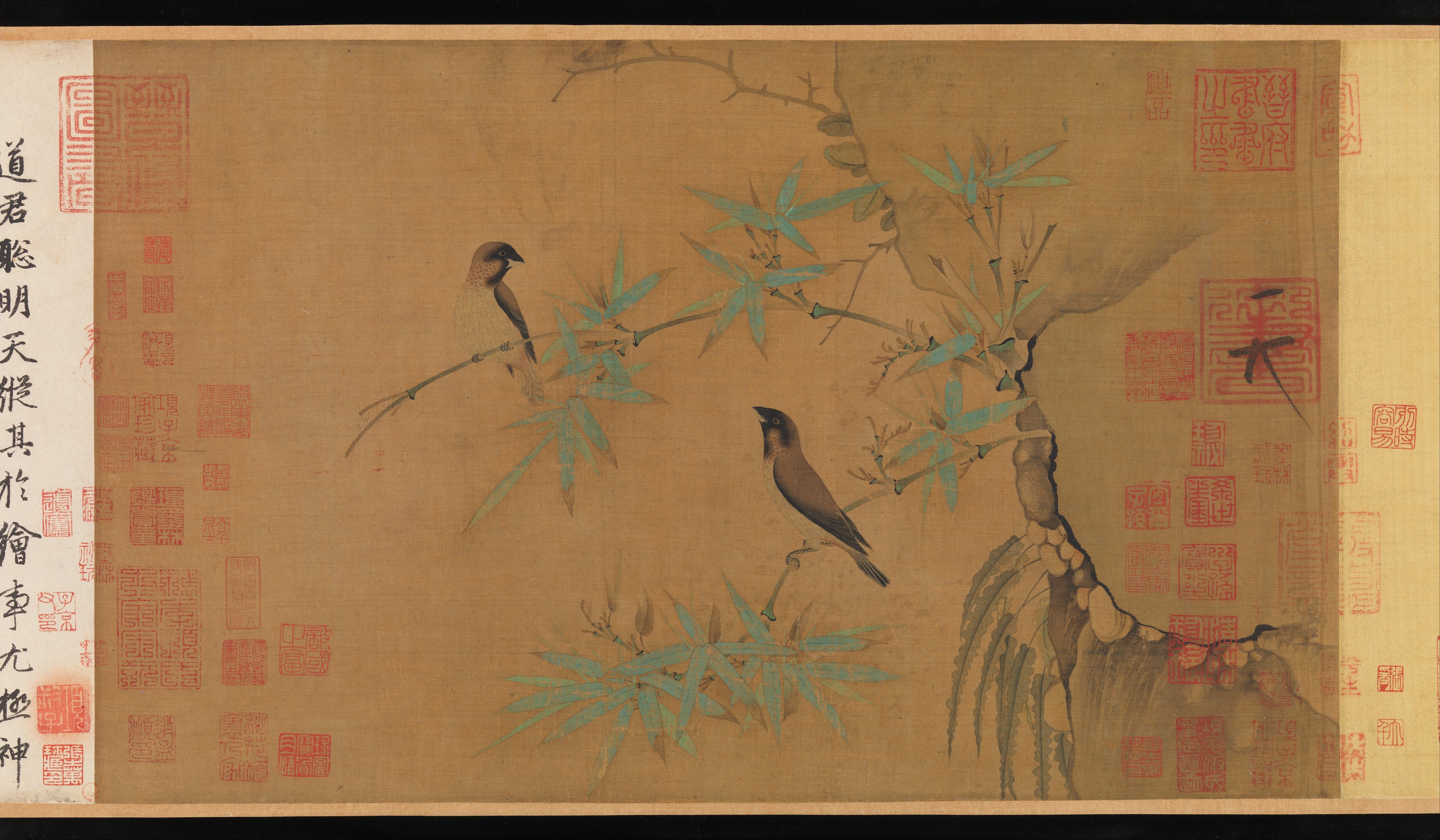
Emperor Huizong of Song was a prolific painter

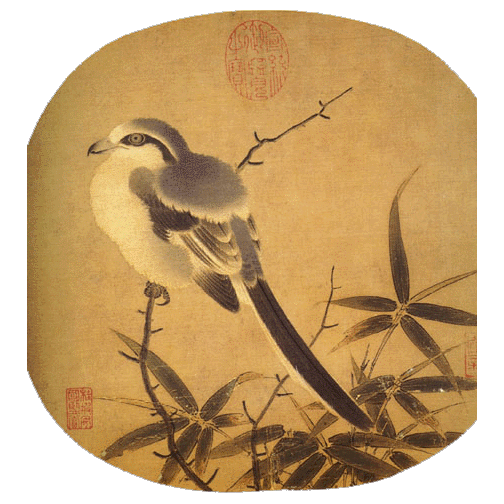
Li Anzhong's Bird on a Branch; it has a circular shape because this was initially painted for a circular fan.

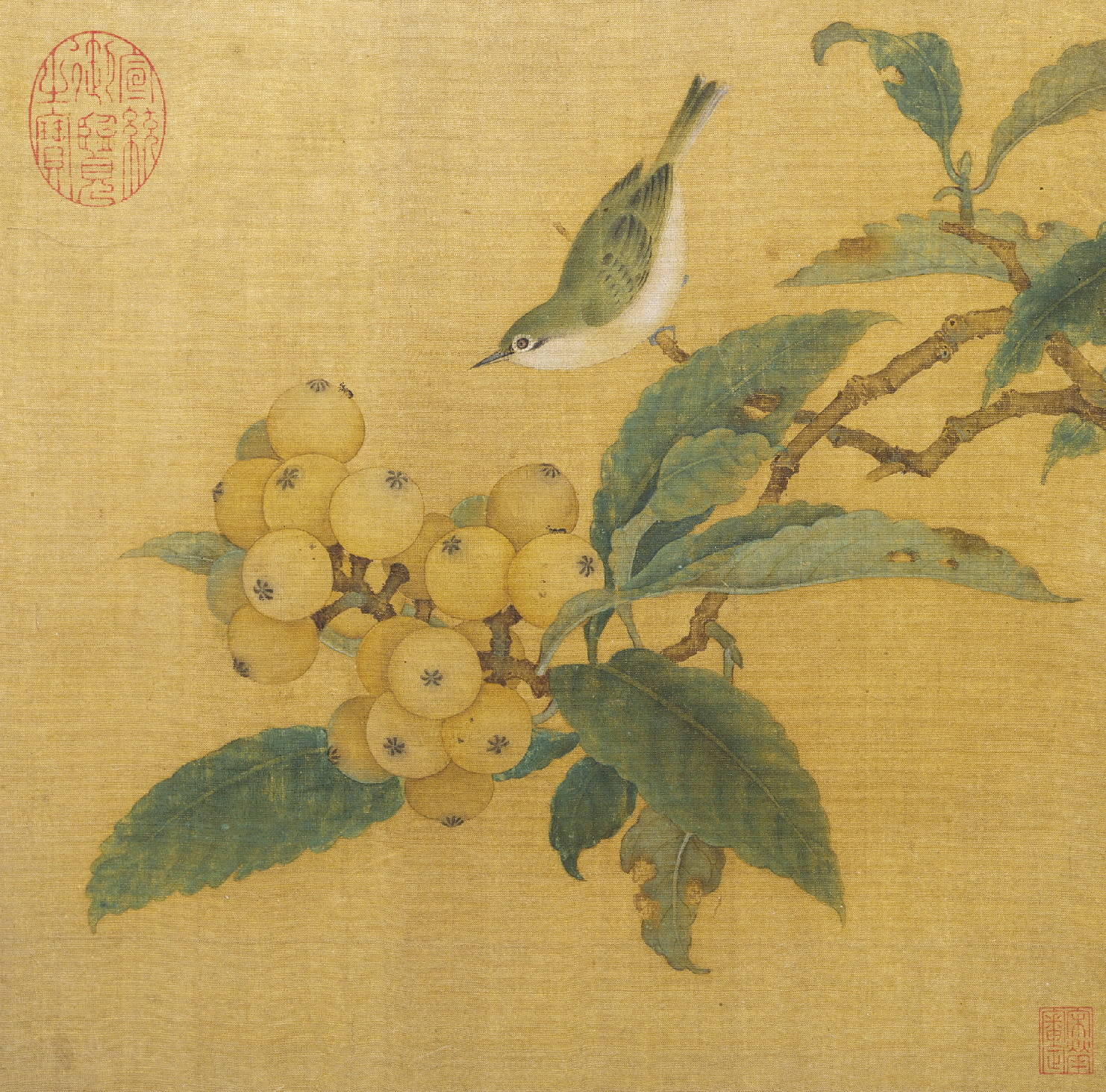
Loquats and a Mountain Bird, Southern Song (1127–1279); small album leaf paintings like this were popular amongst gentry and scholar-officials.

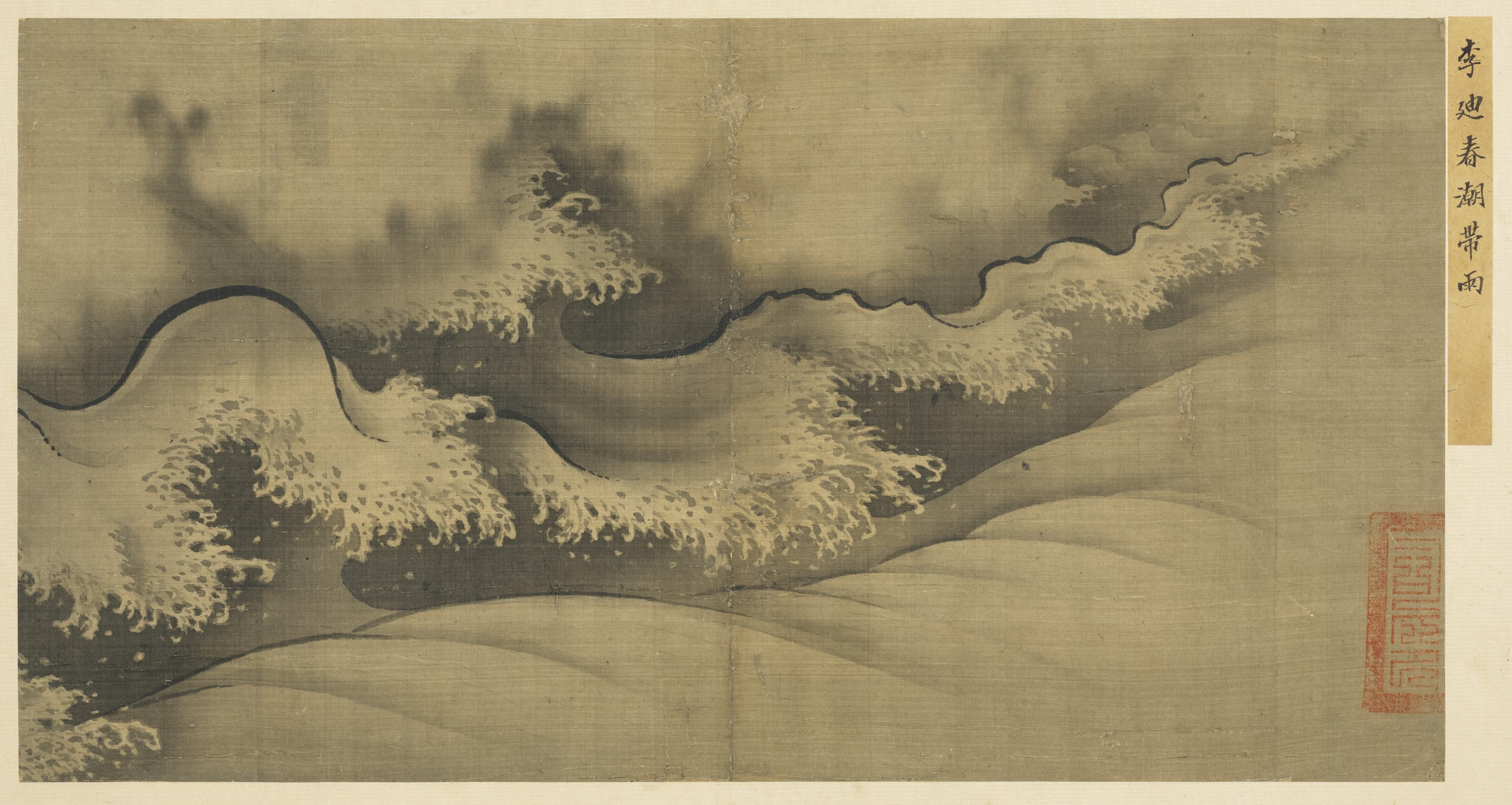
The Spring Tide Brings Rain by Li Di

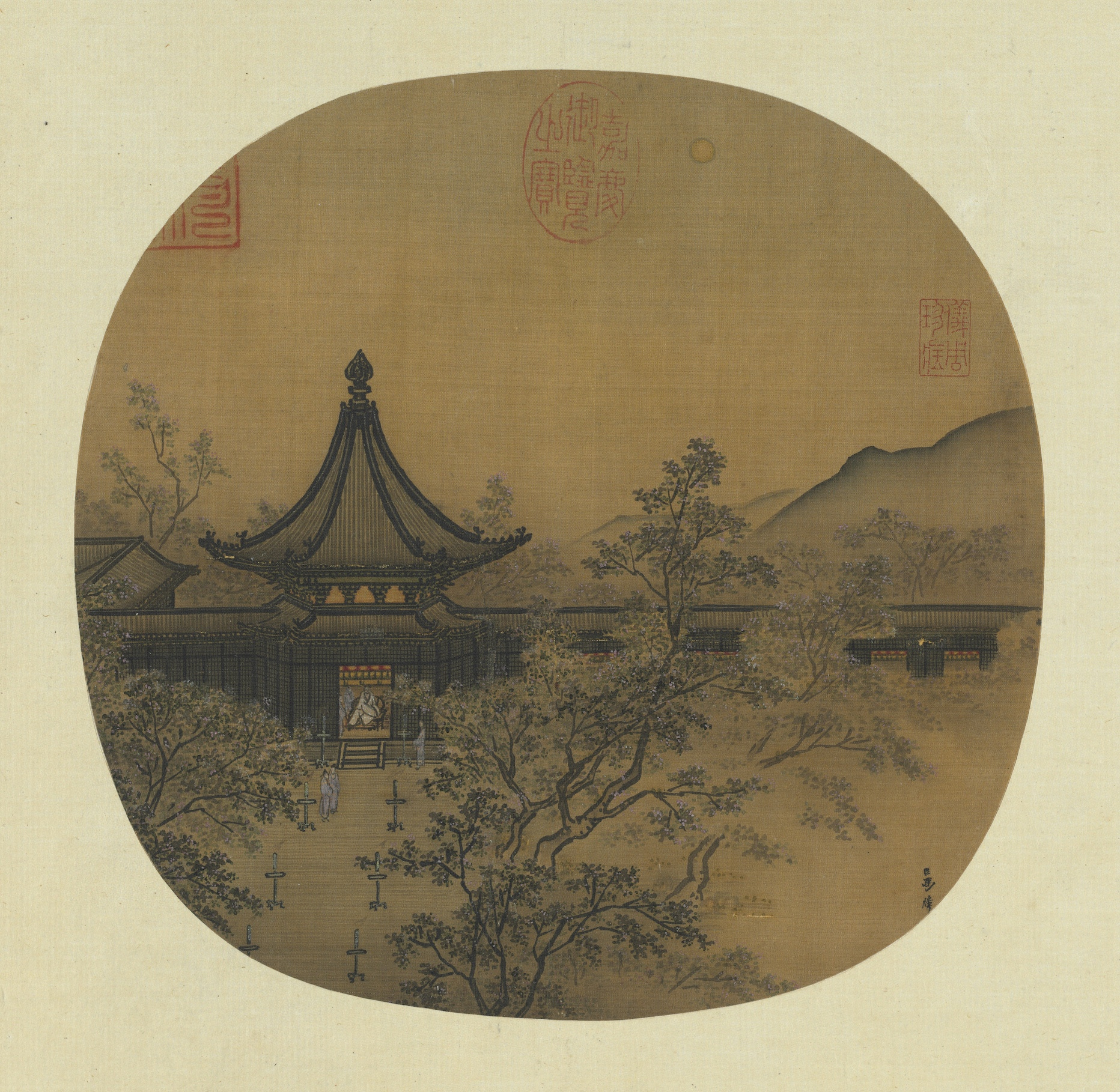
Circular-fan painting by Ma Lin

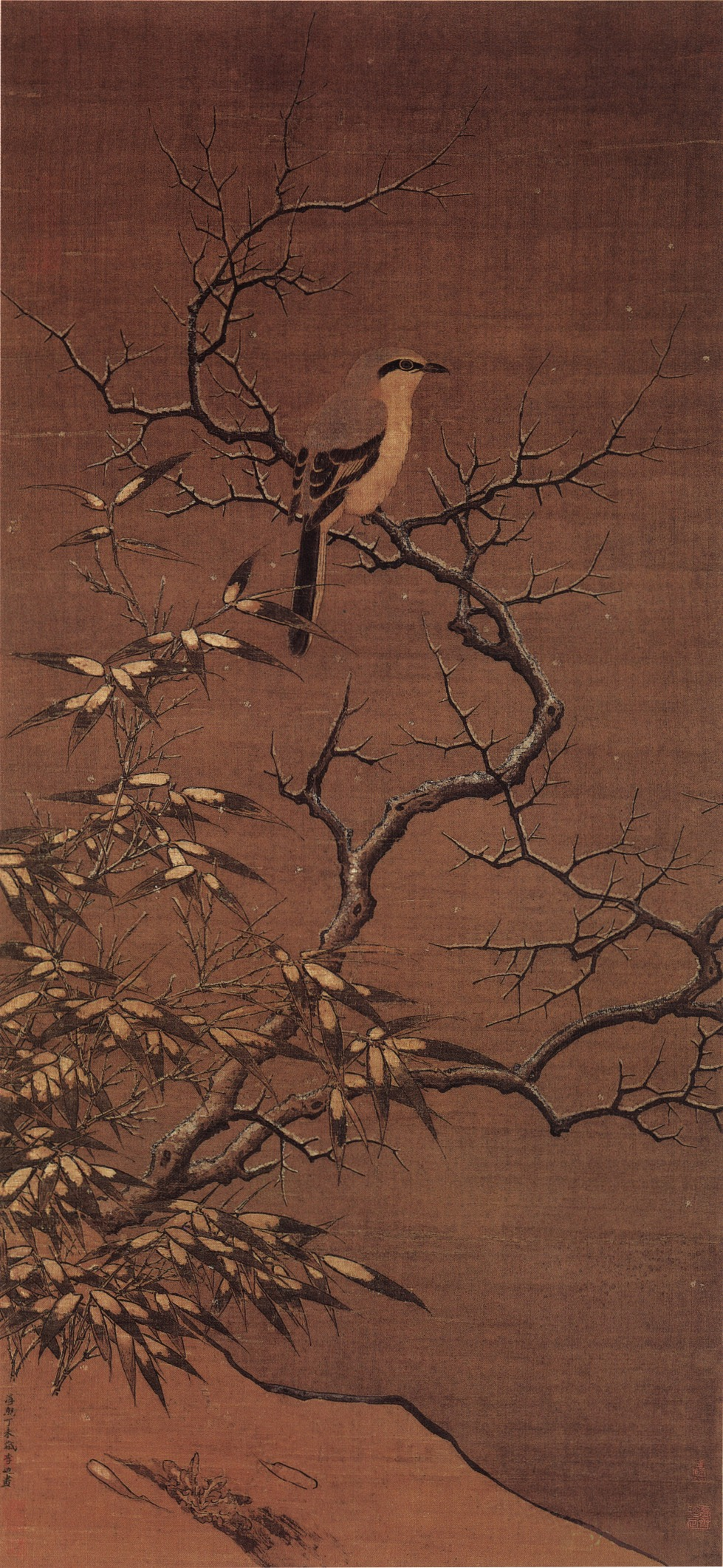
Shrike on a tree in winter; 1187 AD.

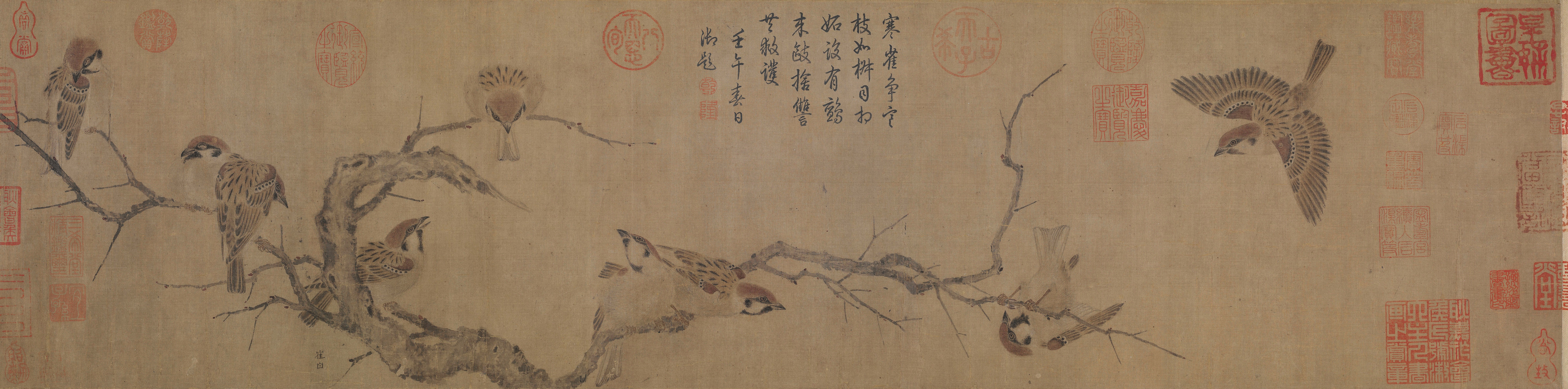
Wintry Sparrows by Cui Bai

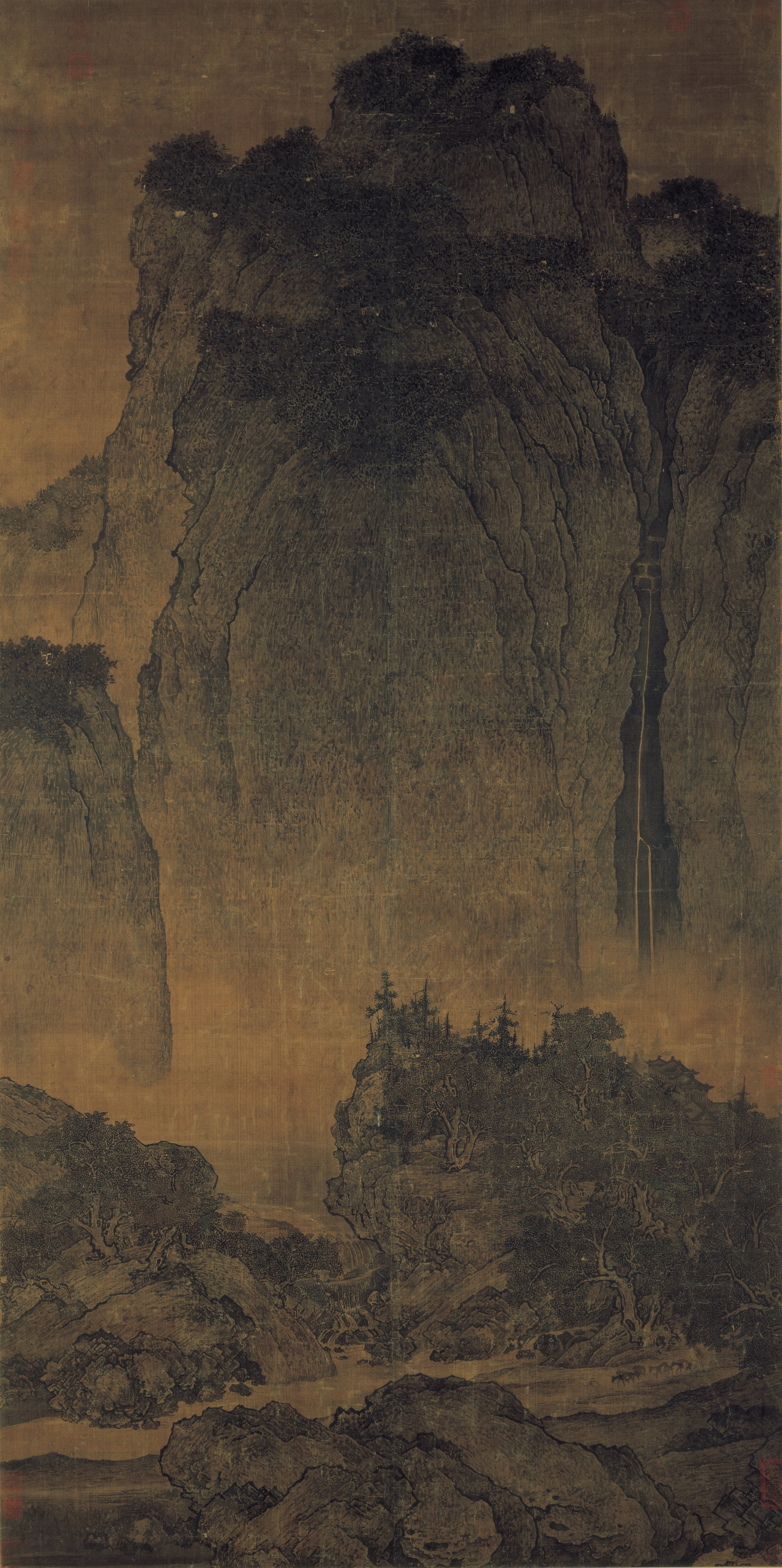
Travelers among Mountains and Streams (谿山行旅), Fan Kuan (c. 960 – 1032)

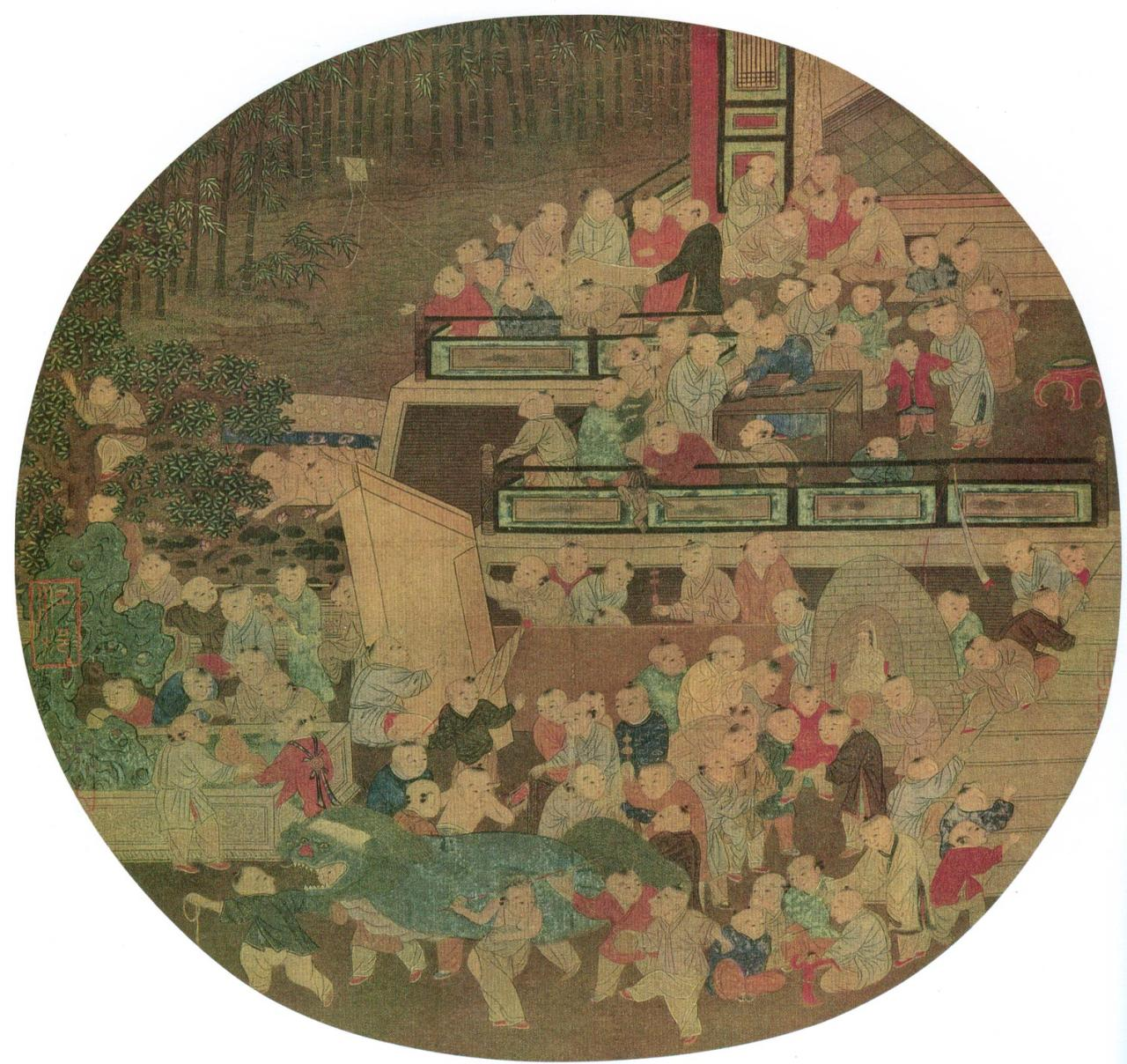
"One Hundred Children Playing in the Spring" by Su Hanchen((1094–1172))

The Knickknack Peddler by Su Hanchen; depictions of common life became a popular motif during the prosperous years of the Song dynasty
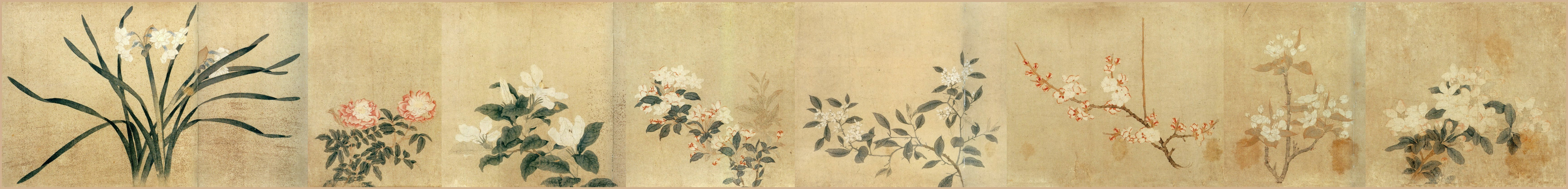
Qian Xuan's Eight Flowers, 13th century.
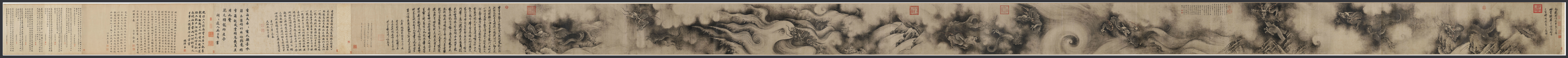
Nine Dragons (painting) by Chen Rong (c.1200-1266)
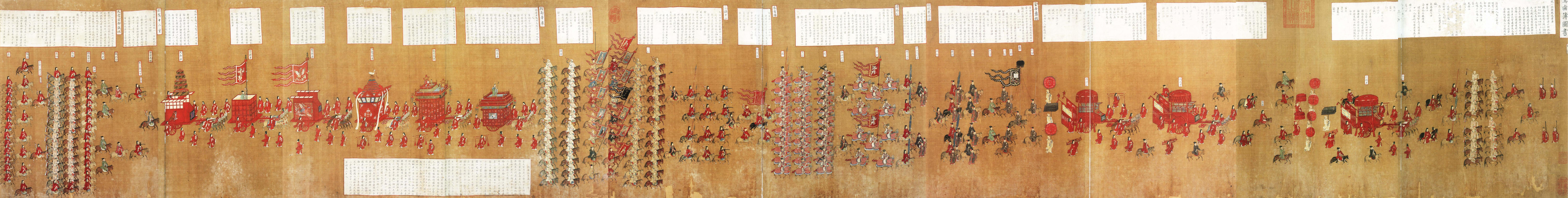
A Northern Song dynasty imperial procession giving tribute to the Lord of Heaven, depicting armed honor guards and officials, dated 1053–1065
Treasures of the Sea, handscroll by Liu Songnian (c. 1150 – after 1225), ink and colour on silk, 26.8 × 320.7 cm, Southern Song dynasty. National Palace Museum

==== Yuan painting ====
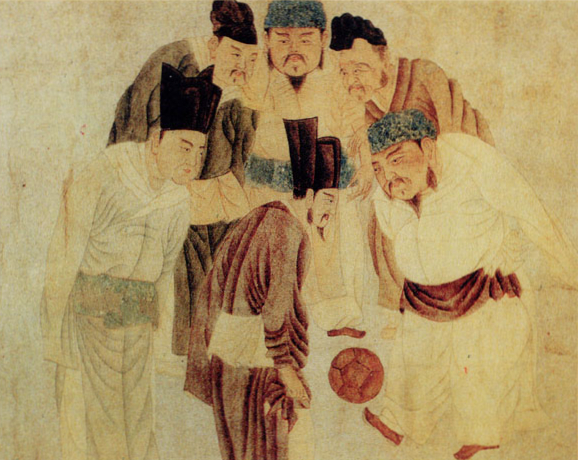
A painting depicting Emperor Taizu of Song playing cuju (i.e. Chinese football) with his prime minister Zhao Pu (趙普) and other ministers, by the Yuan dynasty artist Qian Xuan (1235–1305)

With the fall of the Song dynasty in 1279, and the subsequent dislocation caused by the establishment of the Yuan dynasty by the Mongol conquerors, many court and literary artists retreated from social life, and returned to nature, through landscape paintings, and by renewing the "blue and green" style of the Tang era.

Wang Meng was one such painter, and one of his most famous works is the Forest Grotto. Zhao Mengfu was a Chinese scholar, painter and calligrapher during the Yuan dynasty. His rejection of the refined, gentle brushwork of his era in favor of the cruder style of the 8th century is considered to have brought about a revolution that created the modern Chinese landscape painting. There was also the vivid and detailed works of art by Qian Xuan (1235–1305), who had served the Song court, and out of patriotism refused to serve the Mongols, instead turning to painting. He was also famous for reviving and reproducing a more Tang dynasty style of painting.

The later Yuan dynasty is characterized by the work of the so-called "Four Great Masters". The most notable of these was Huang Gongwang (1269–1354) whose cool and restrained landscapes were admired by contemporaries, and by the Chinese literati painters of later centuries. Another of great influence was Ni Zan (1301–1374), who frequently arranged his compositions with a strong and distinct foreground and background, but left the middle-ground as an empty expanse. This scheme was frequently to be adopted by later Ming and Qing dynasty painters.

==== Pottery ====
Chinese porcelain is made from a hard paste made of the clay kaolin and a feldspar called petuntse, which cements the vessel and seals any pores. China has become synonymous with high-quality porcelain. Most china pots comes from the city of Jingdezhen in Jiangxi province. Jingdezhen porcelain, under a variety of names, has been central to porcelain production in China since at least the Yuan dynasty.

=== Late imperial China (1368–1912) ===
==== Ming painting ====
Under the Ming dynasty, Chinese culture bloomed. Narrative painting, with a wider color range and a much busier composition than the Song paintings, was immensely popular during the time.

Wen Zhengming (1470–1559) developed the style of the Wu school in Suzhou, which dominated Chinese painting during the 16th century.

Dong Qichang (1555–1636) further influenced East Asian art history by absorbing Chan Buddhism ideas and putting forward the "Southern and Northern Schools" theory.

European culture began to make an impact on Chinese art during this period. The Jesuit priest Matteo Ricci visited Nanjing with many Western artworks, which were influential in showing different techniques of perspective and shading.

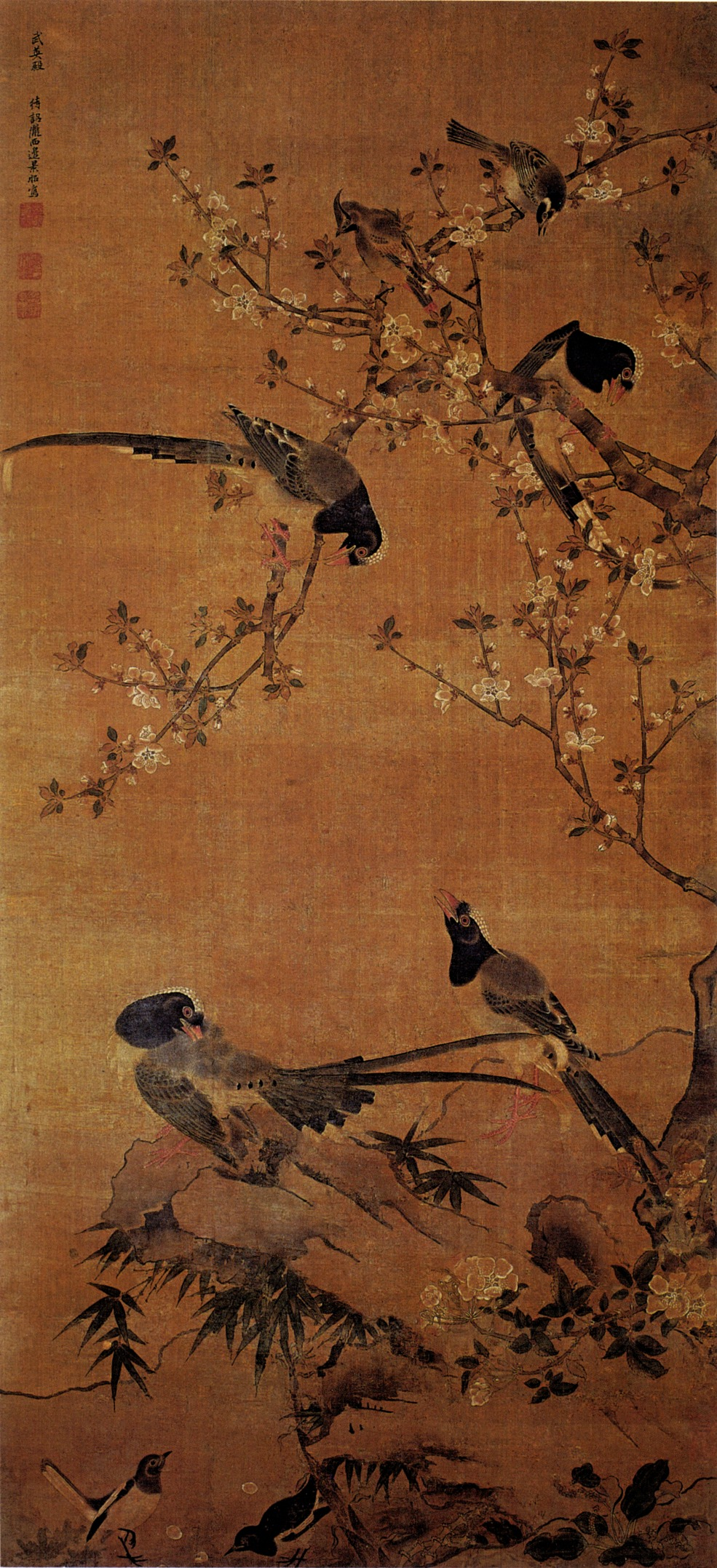
Bian Jingzhao's intricate Gongbi took after the styles of Song, whilst incorporating other artistic styles

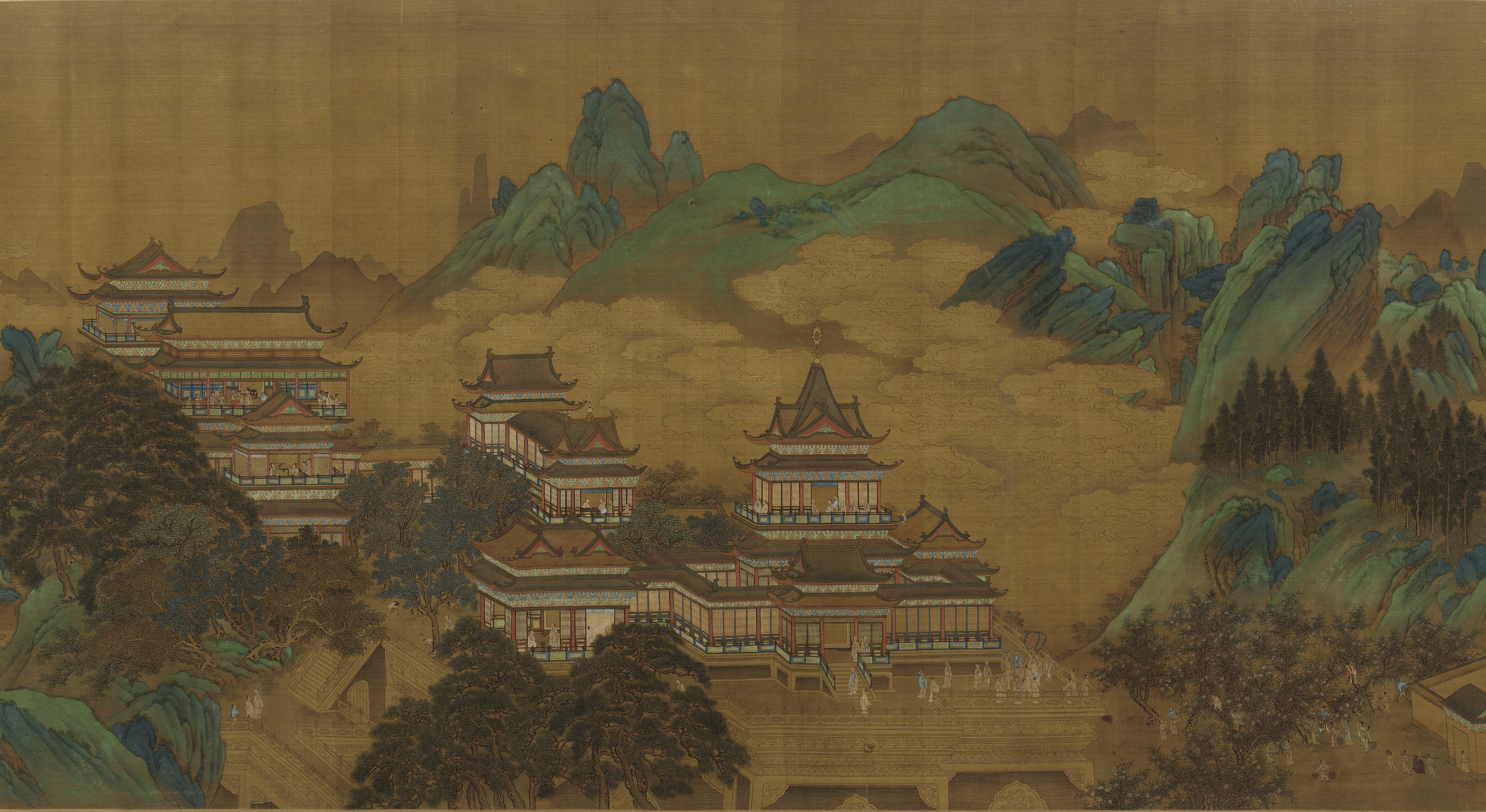
Peach Festival of the Queen Mother of the West, early 17th century, Ming dynasty.

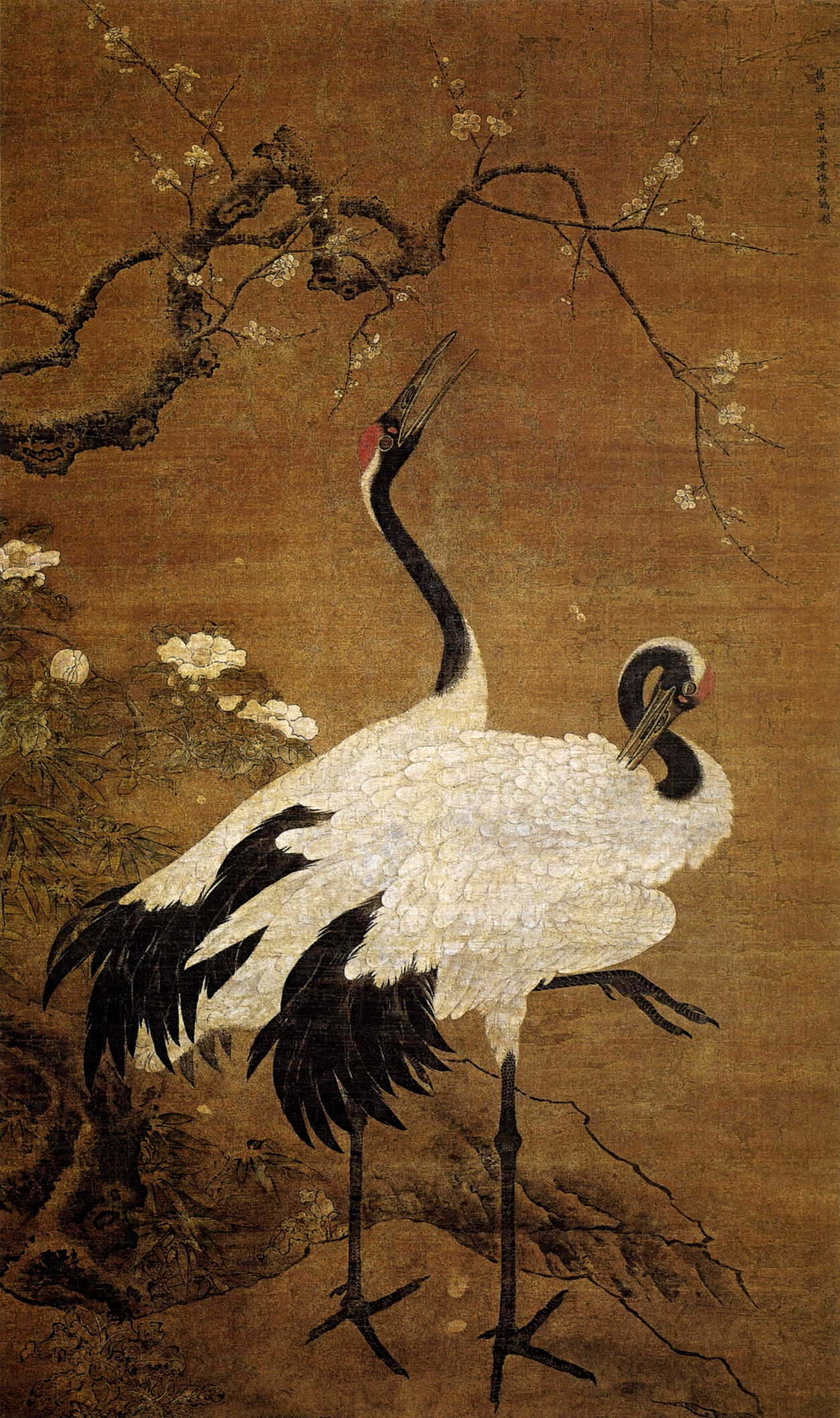
Bian Jingzhao's Snow Plum and Twin Cranes incorporating the Gonbi style, 15th century.

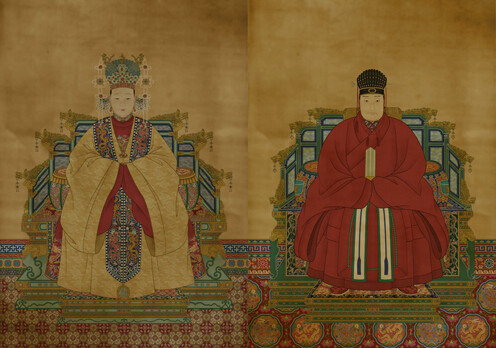
Emperor Shenzong and Empress Xiaoduan

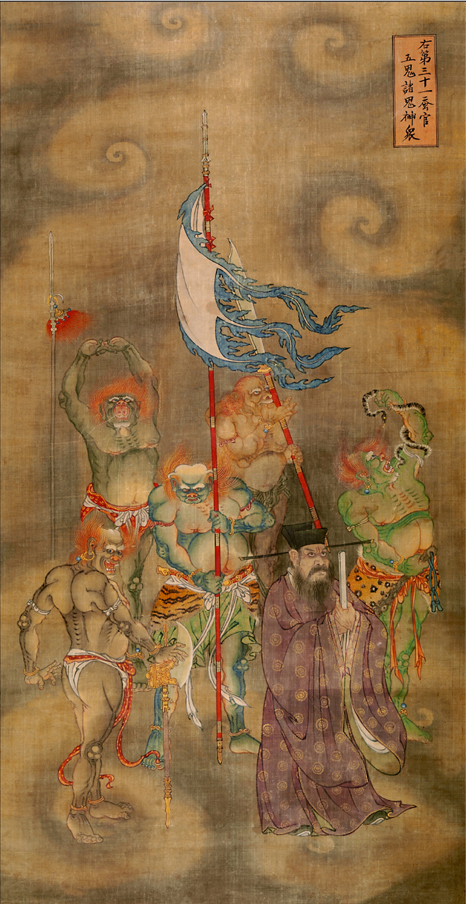
Shuilu ritual painting of Canshen and the Five Demons of Pestilence, Baoning Temple, Ming dynasty

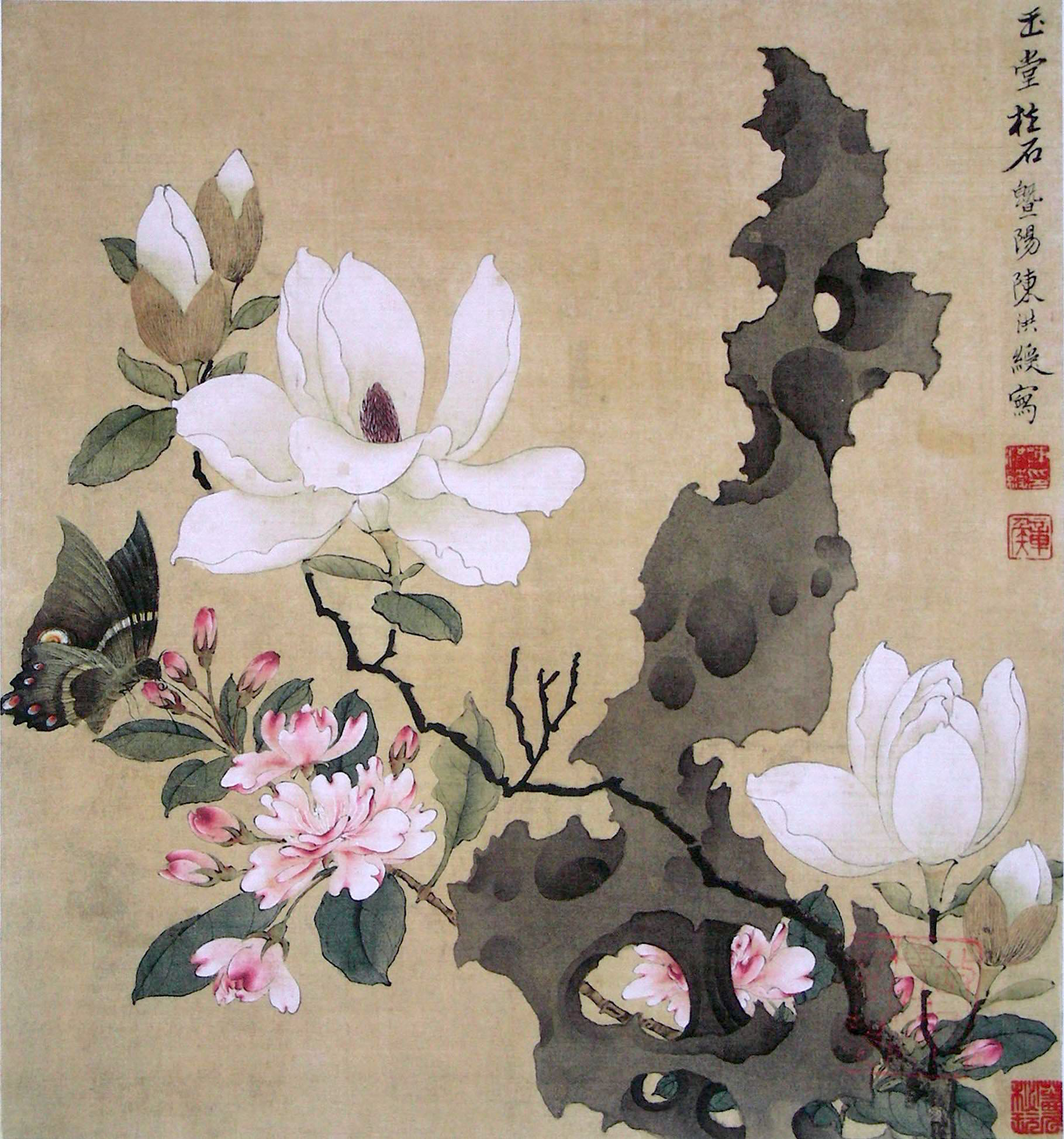
Magnolia and Erect Rock (玉堂柱石圖)

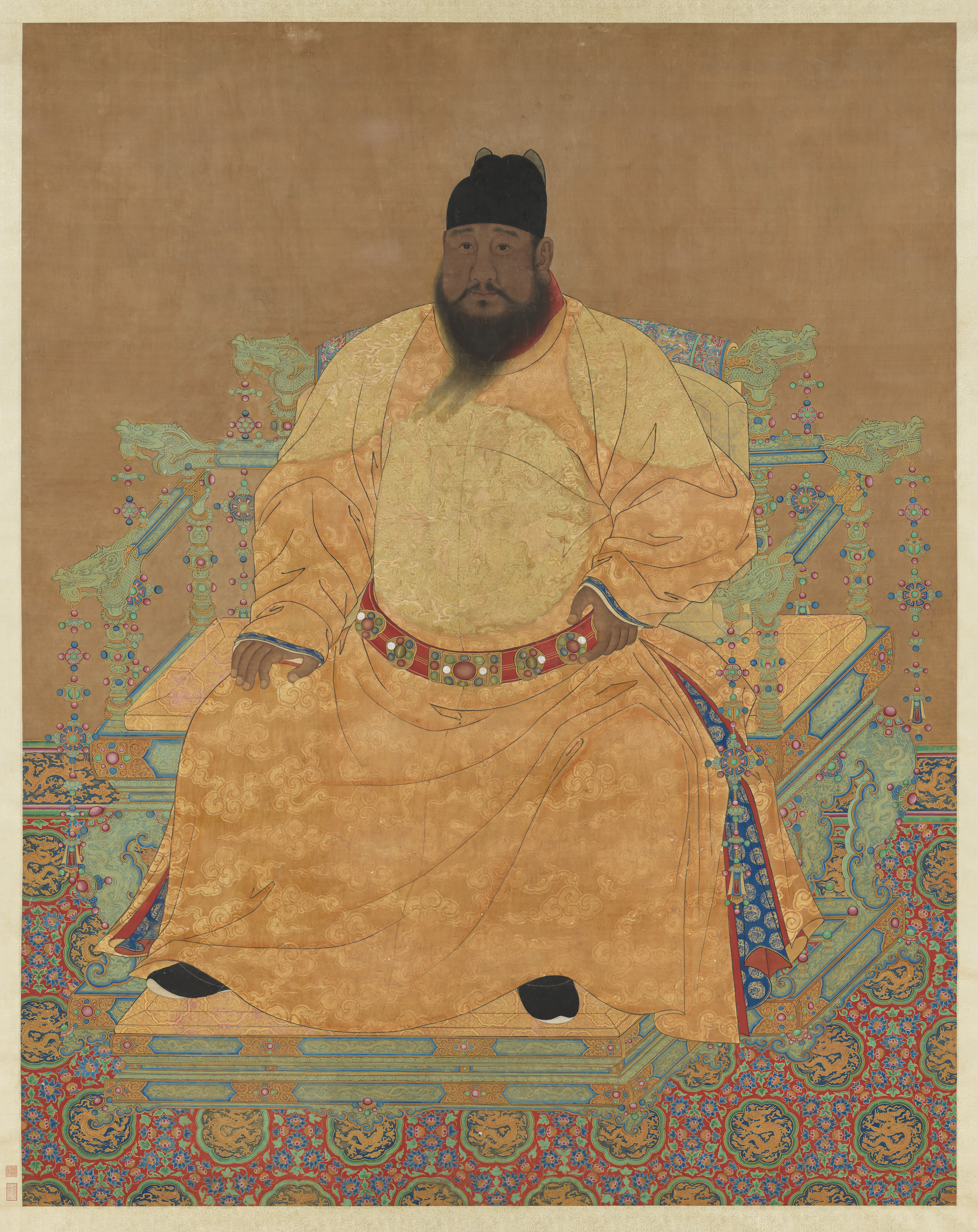
Ming portraiture also took after Song styles, however it shed its adherence to plainness and austerity.

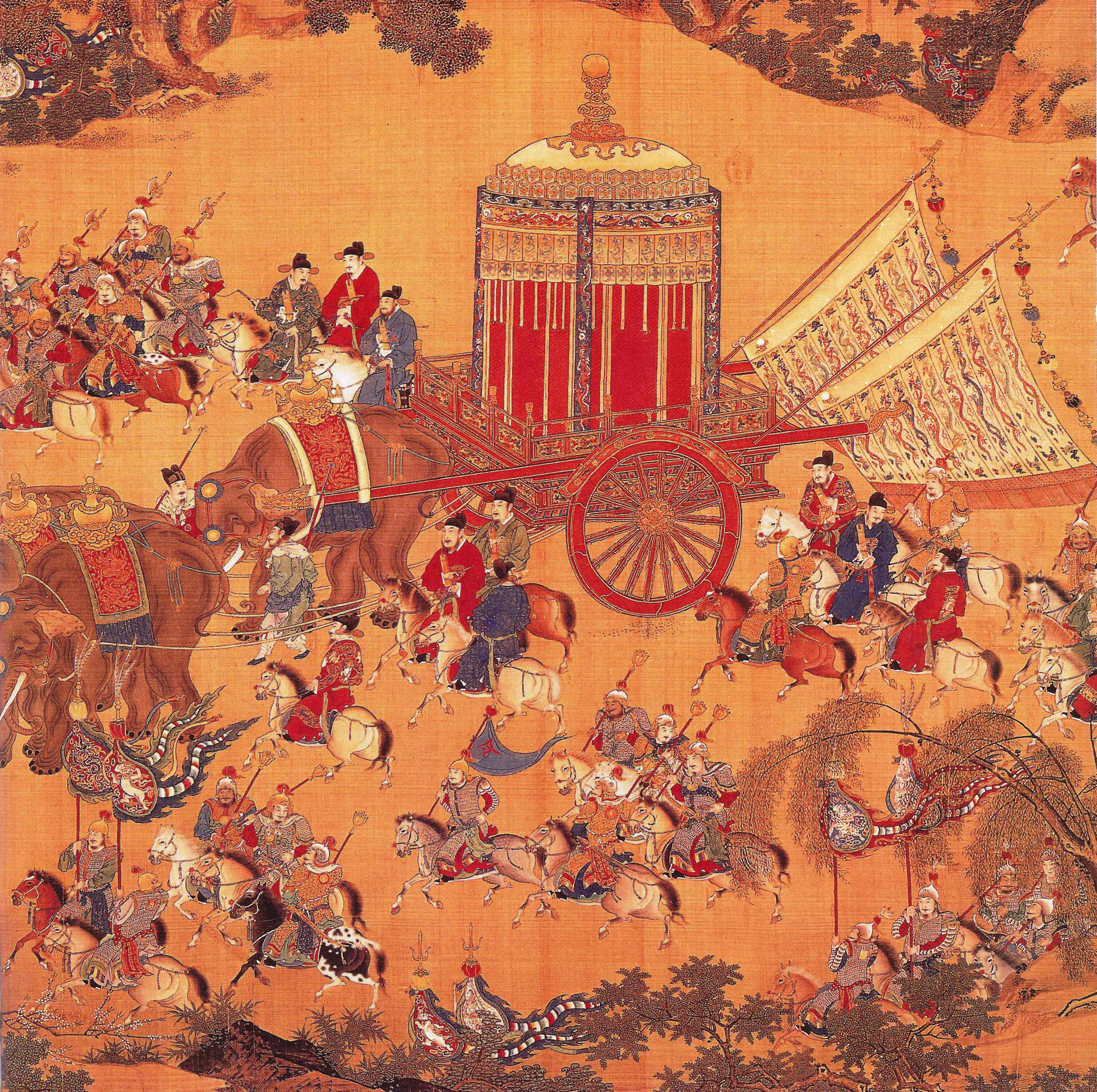
Detail of The Emperor's Approach showing the Wanli Emperor's royal carriage being pulled by elephants and escorted by cavalry (full panoramic painting here)

==== Early Qing painting ====
The early Qing dynasty developed in two main strands: the Orthodox school, and the Individualist painters, both of which followed the theories of Dong Qichang, but emphasizing very different aspects. Court painting of the Qing dynasty was also greatly influenced by Western artists such as Jean Denis Attiret (1702–1768) and Giuseppe Castiglione (1688–1766).

The Four Wangs, including Wang Jian (1598–1677) and Wang Shimin (1592–1680), were particularly renowned in the Orthodox school, and sought inspiration in recreating the past styles, especially the technical skills in brushstrokes and calligraphy of ancient masters. The younger Wang Yuanqi (1642–1715) ritualized the approach of engaging with and drawing inspiration from a work of an ancient master. His own works were often annotated with his theories of how his painting relates to the master's model.

The Individualist painters included Bada Shanren (1626–1705) and Shitao (1641–1707). They drew more from the revolutionary ideas of transcending the tradition to achieve an original individualistic styles; in this way they were more faithfully following the way of Dong Qichang than the Orthodox school (who were his official direct followers.)

Painters outside of the literati-scholar and aristocratic traditions also gained renown, with some artists creating paintings to sell for money. These included Ma Quan (late 17th–18th century), who depicted common flowers, birds, and insects that were not typical subject matter among scholars. Such painters were, however, not separated from formal schools of painting, but were usually well-versed in artistic styles and techniques. Ma Quan, for example, modelled her brushwork on Song dynasty examples. Simultaneously, the boneless technique (Chinese: 沒骨畫), thought to have originated as a preparatory step when painting gold-line images during the Tang, was continued by painters like Yun Shouping (1633–1690) and his descendant Yun Bing.

As the techniques of color printing were perfected, illustrated manuals on the art of painting began to be published. Jieziyuan Huazhuan (Manual of the Mustard Seed Garden), a five-volume work first published in 1679, has been in use as a technical textbook for artists and students ever since.

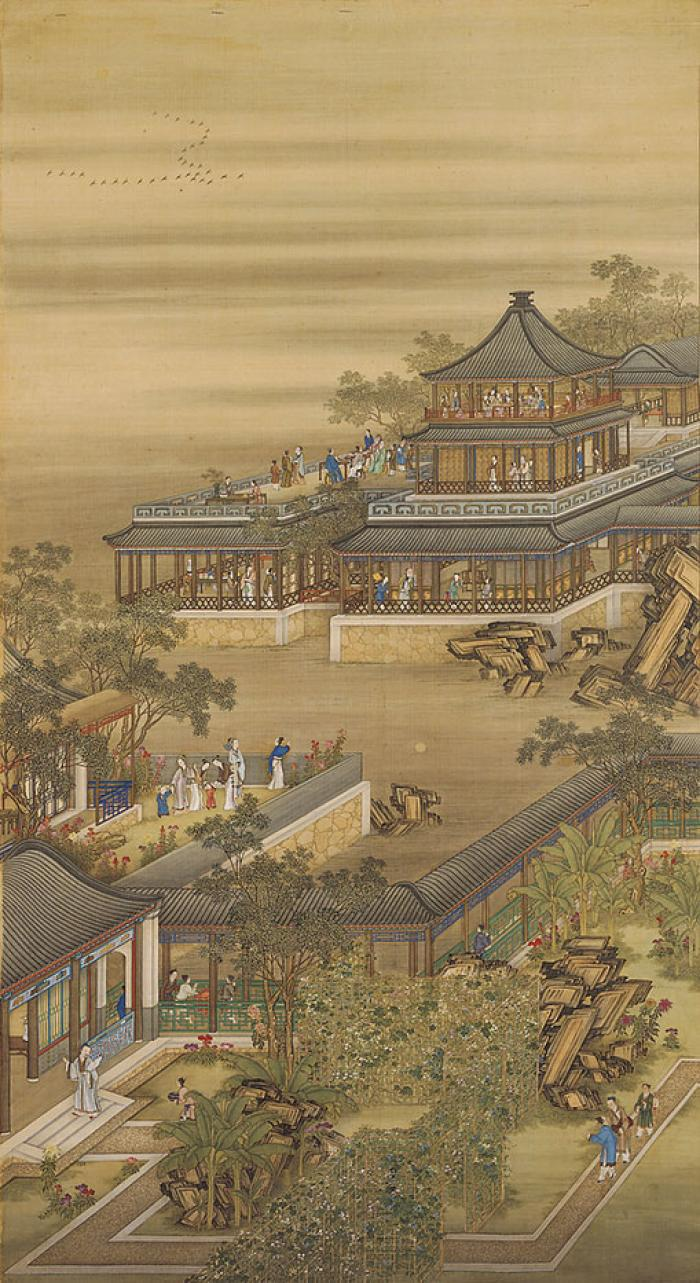
The Yongzheng Emperor Enjoying Himself During the 8th Lunar Month, by anonymous court artists, 1723–1735 AD, Palace Museum, Beijing, showing the use of linear perspective.

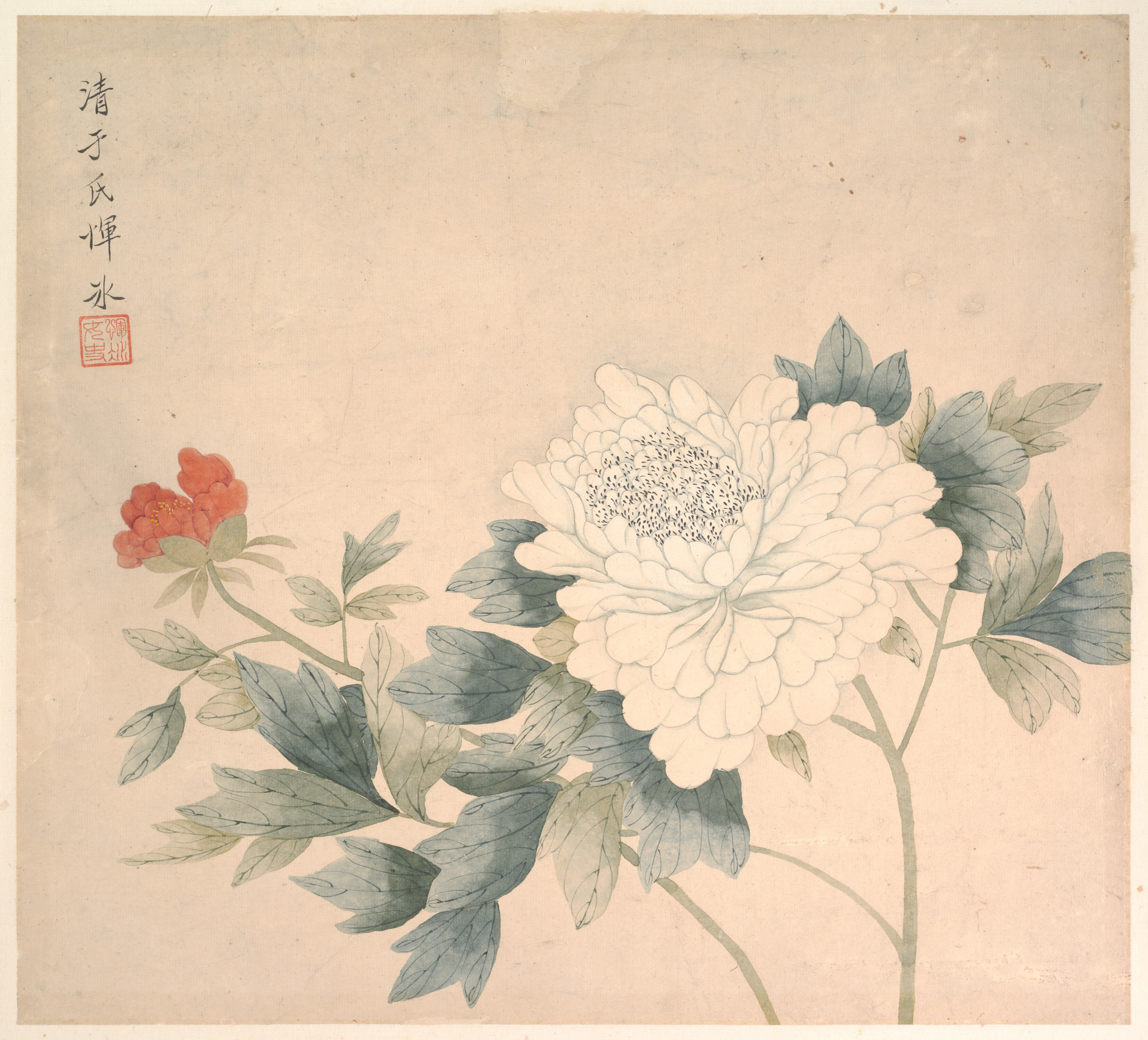
Album Leaf, Yun Bing, 17th century, Metropolitan Museum of Art, New York, showing the "boneless" technique.

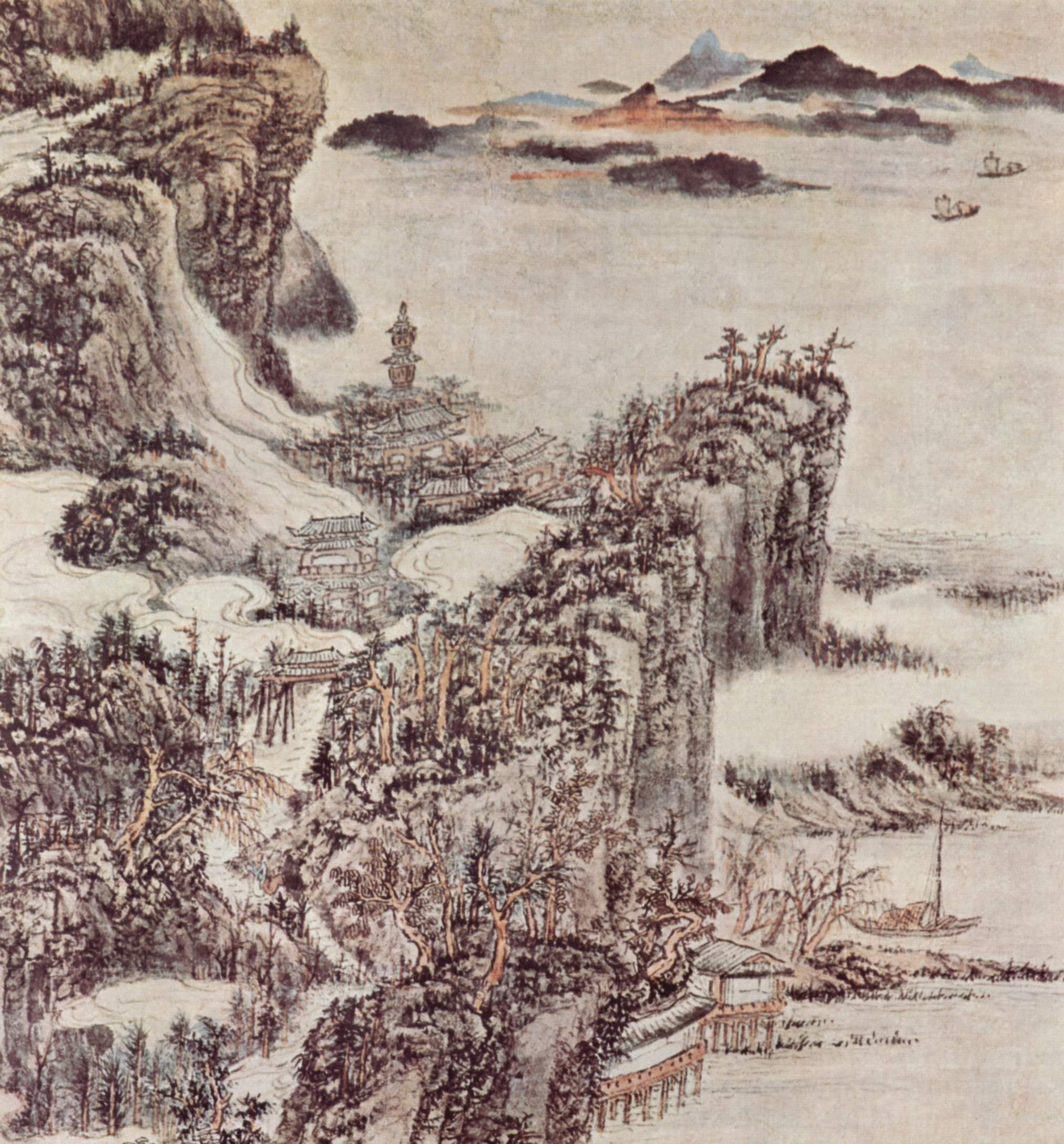
Chinese painting from 1664 by Qing dynasty painter Kun Can

==== Late Qing art ====
The late Qing Dynasty generally refers to the period from the Opium War in 1840 to the fall of the Qing Dynasty in 1912. During this period, the Qing court's national strength declined, internal and external troubles were constant, wars occurred frequently, and the country's doors were forced to open. Western culture and commercial economy flooded into China in large numbers, and the traditional feudal social structure gradually disintegrated. Urban commerce, especially at trading ports like Shanghai, flourished rapidly.

The dramatic changes in the social situation directly affected the development of painting: traditional painting, which originally served the court and scholars and literati, was no longer confined to a lofty and reclusive style and began to move towards the common people and the market. The collision of Chinese and Western cultures also led painting to no longer adhere to ancient methods, resulting in a major transformation in aesthetics and style. Secularization, commercialization, and the integration of Chinese and Western cultures became the most prominent features of late Qing Dynasty painting.

The most representative school of painting in the late Qing Dynasty was the Shanghai School (海派) Haipai, which emerged with the trading port of Shanghai as its center. With the commercial development and the expansion of the urban middle class in Shanghai, calligraphy and paintings have become tradable commodities. Painters no longer merely pursue the lofty artistic conception of scholars but instead cater to the aesthetic standards of the general public. Their subjects have become more popular, the colors more vivid, and the paintings more lively and engaging.

Representative figures of the Shanghai School include Ren Bonian, Wu Changshuo, Xu Gu, and Zhao Zhiqian. In terms of style, there has been a significant change compared to the mid-Qing Dynasty: no longer blindly pursuing elegance and coldness, the colors are rich and bright, and the brushstrokes are unrestrained and free. The themes have expanded from traditional landscape seclusion to include common people, flowers, birds, auspicious beasts, and folk auspicious themes. At the same time, it incorporates the vigorous brushwork of metal and stone calligraphy, with a full and grand composition that appeals to both refined and popular tastes. It not only retains the traditional brush-and-ink foundation of literati painting but also closely aligns with the lives of citizens and the commercial market, laying an important foundation for the transformation of modern Chinese painting.

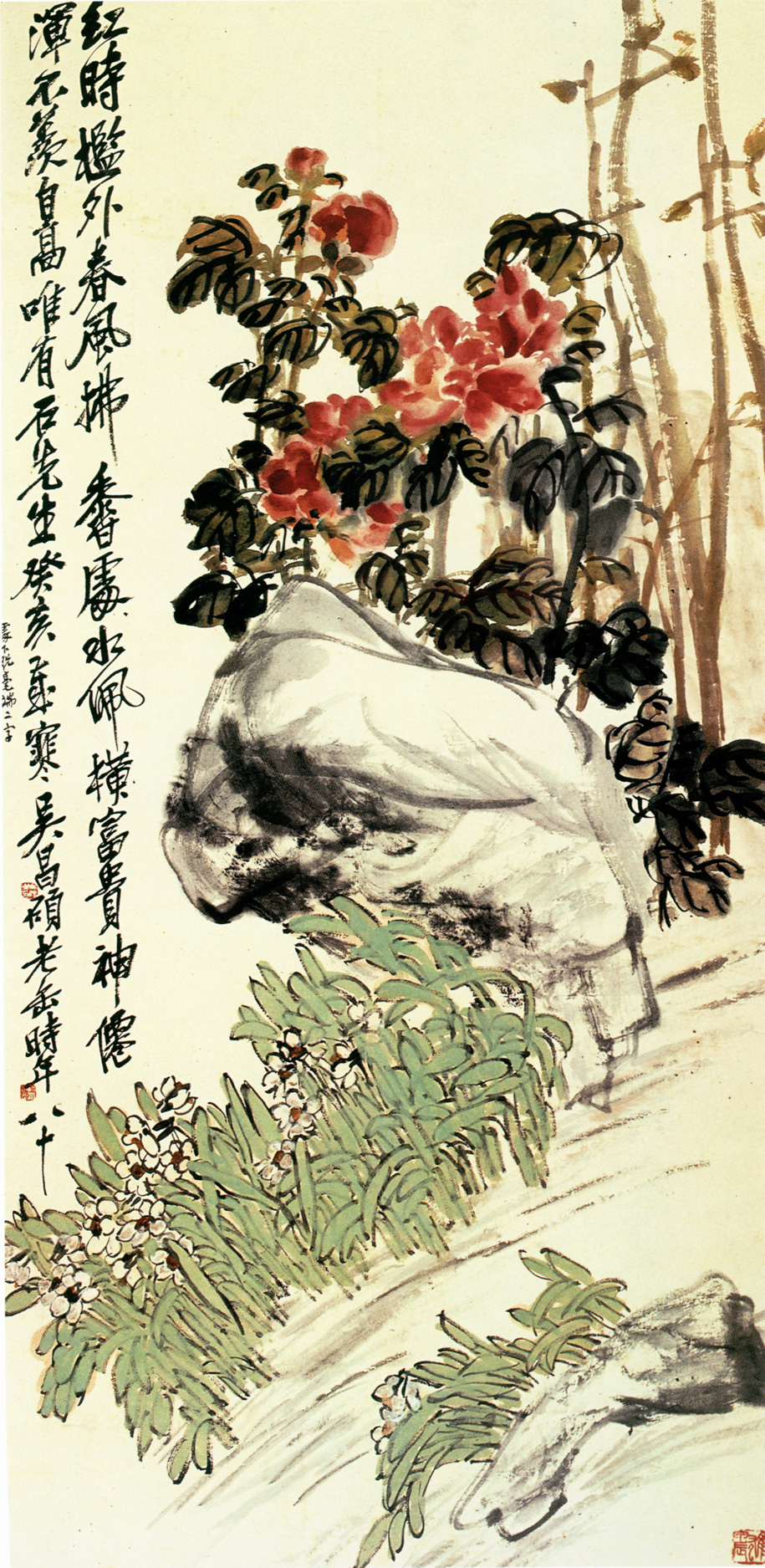
Peonies and Daffodils by Wu Changshuo

Nianhua were a form of colored woodblock prints in China, depicting images for decoration during the Chinese New Year. In the 19th century Nianhua were used as news mediums.

==== Shanghai School ====
The Shanghai School is a very important Chinese school of traditional arts during the Qing dynasty and the 20th century. Under efforts of masters from this school, traditional Chinese art reached another climax and continued to the present in forms of Chinese painting (中國畫), or guohua (國畫) for short. The Shanghai School challenged and broke the literati tradition of Chinese art, while also paying technical homage to the ancient masters and improving on existing traditional techniques. Members of this school were themselves educated literati who had come to question their very status and the purpose of art, and had anticipated the impending modernization of Chinese society. In an era of rapid social change, works from the Shanghai School were widely innovative and diverse, and often contained thoughtful yet subtle social commentary. The best known figures from this school are Ren Xiong, Ren Bonian, Zhao Zhiqian, Wu Changshuo, Sha Menghai, Pan Tianshou, Fu Baoshi, He Tianjian, and Xie Zhiliu. Other well-known painters include Wang Zhen, Zhang Xiong, and Yang Borun.

== Painting ==
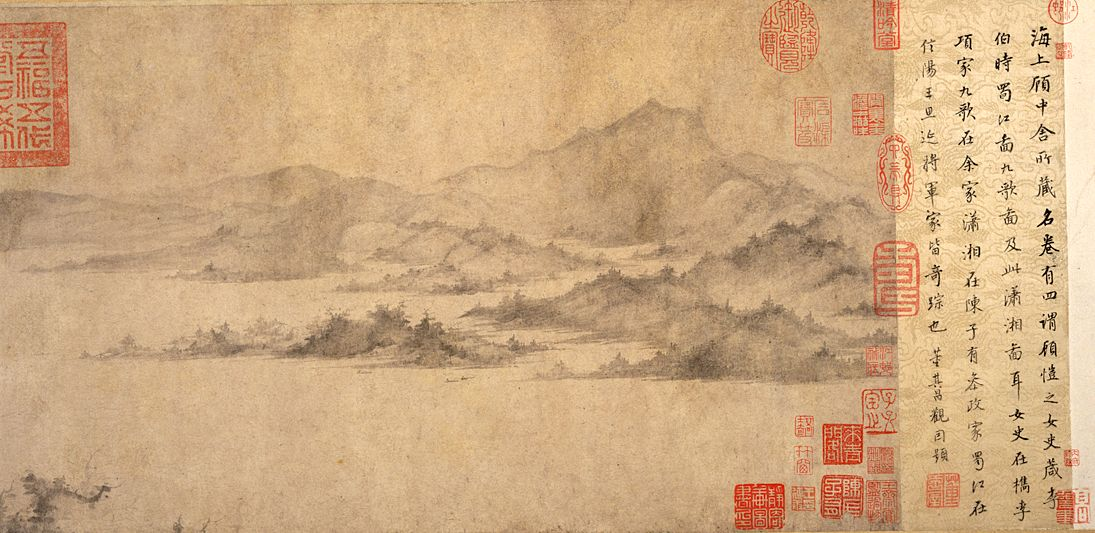
Part of Eight Views of Xiaoxiang, an imaginary tour through Xiao-xiang by Li Shi (李氏); 12th-century; scroll, ink on paper; 30 × 400 cm; Tokyo National Museum

Traditional Chinese painting, like Chinese calligraphy, is done with a brush dipped in black or colored ink; oils are not used. As with calligraphy, the most popular materials on which paintings are made of are paper and silk. The finished work can be mounted on scrolls, such as hanging scrolls or handscrolls. Traditional painting can also be done on album sheets, walls, lacquerware, folding screens, and other media.

The two main techniques in Chinese painting are:

- Gong-bi (工筆), meaning "meticulous", uses highly detailed brushstrokes that delimits details very precisely. It is often highly coloured and usually depicts figural or narrative subjects. It is often practised by artists working for the royal court or in independent workshops. Bird-and-flower paintings were often in this style.
- Ink and wash painting, in Chinese Shui-mo or (水墨) also loosely termed watercolour or brush painting, and also known as literati painting, as it was one of the four arts of the Chinese Scholar-official class. In theory this was an art practised by gentlemen, a distinction that begins to be made in writings on art from the Song dynasty, though in fact the careers of leading exponents could benefit considerably. This style is also referred to as "xie yi" (寫意) or freehand style.

Artists from the Han to the Tang dynasties mainly painted the human figure. Much of what is known of early Chinese figure painting comes from burial sites, where paintings were preserved on silk banners, lacquered objects, and tomb walls. Many early tomb paintings were meant to protect the dead or help their souls get to paradise. Others illustrated the teachings of the Chinese philosopher Confucius, or showed scenes of daily life. Most Chinese portraits showed a formal full-length frontal view, and were used in the family in ancestor veneration. Imperial portraits were more flexible, but were generally not seen outside the court, and portraiture formed no part of Imperial propaganda, as in other cultures.

Many critics consider landscape to be the highest form of Chinese painting. The time from the Five Dynasties period to the Northern Song period (907–1127) is known as the "Great age of Chinese landscape". In the north, artists such as Jing Hao, Li Cheng, Fan Kuan, and Guo Xi painted pictures of towering mountains, using strong black lines, ink wash, and sharp, dotted brushstrokes to suggest rough rocks. In the south, Dong Yuan, Juran, and other artists painted the rolling hills and rivers of their native countryside in peaceful scenes done with softer, rubbed brushwork. These two kinds of scenes and techniques became the classical styles of Chinese landscape painting.

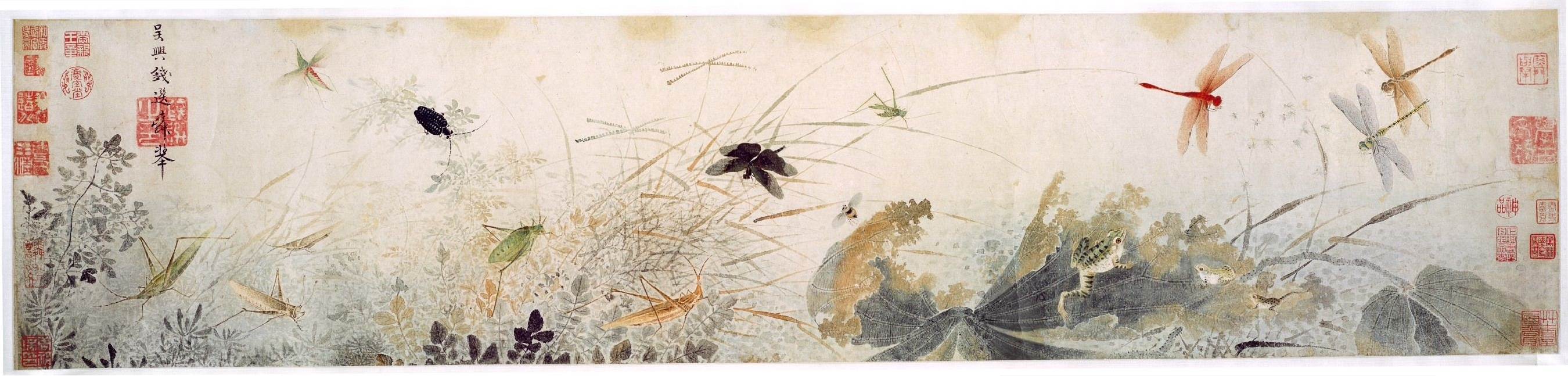
Early Autumn; by Qian Xuan; 13th century; ink and colors on paper scroll; 26.7 × 120.7 cm; Detroit Institute of Arts. The decaying lotus leaves and dragonflies hovering over stagnant water are probably a veiled criticism of Mongol rule.

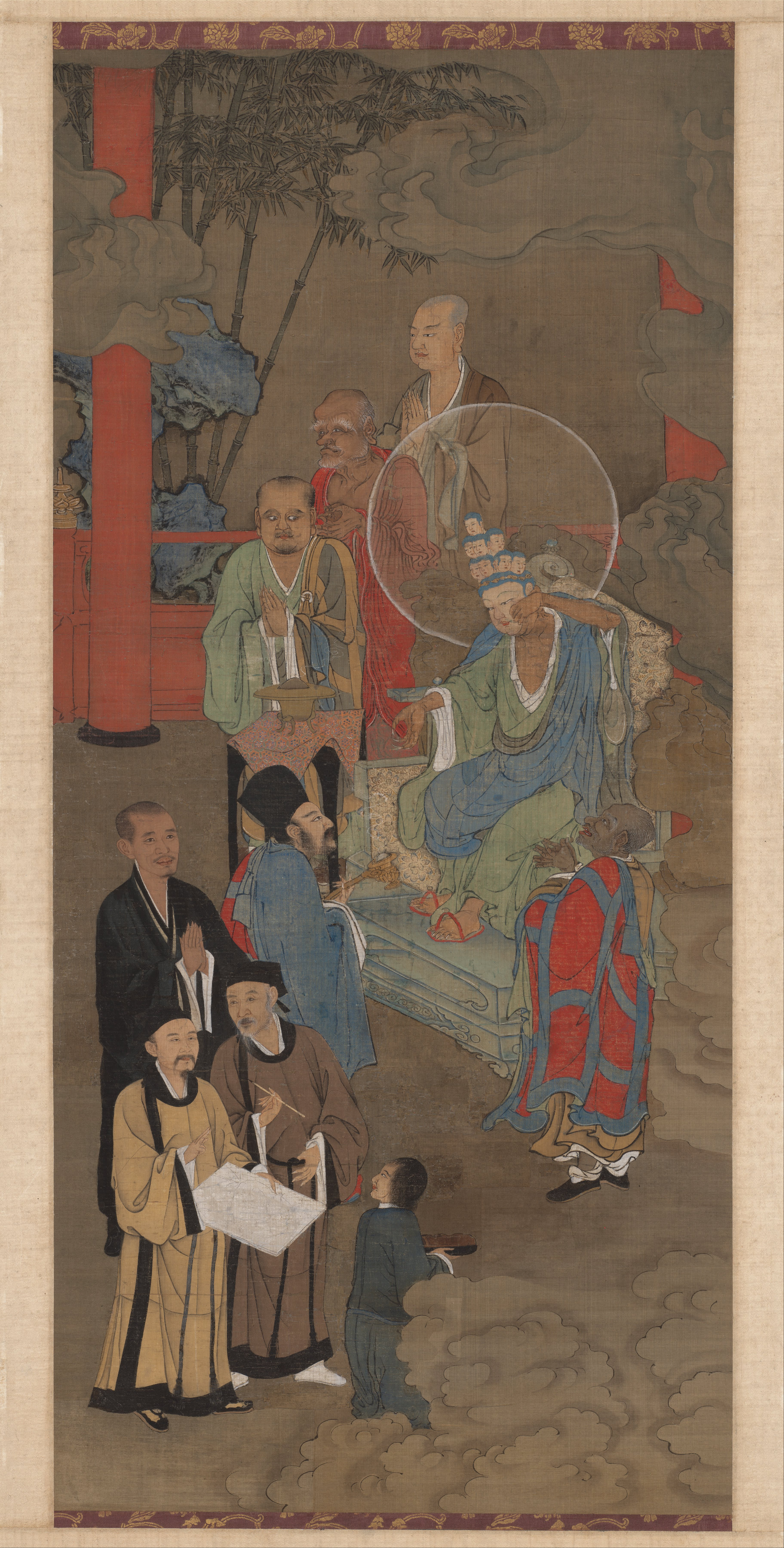
Lohan manifesting himself as an eleven-headed Guanyin; circa 1178; ink and color on silk; 111.5 × 53.1 cm; Museum of Fine Arts, Boston.

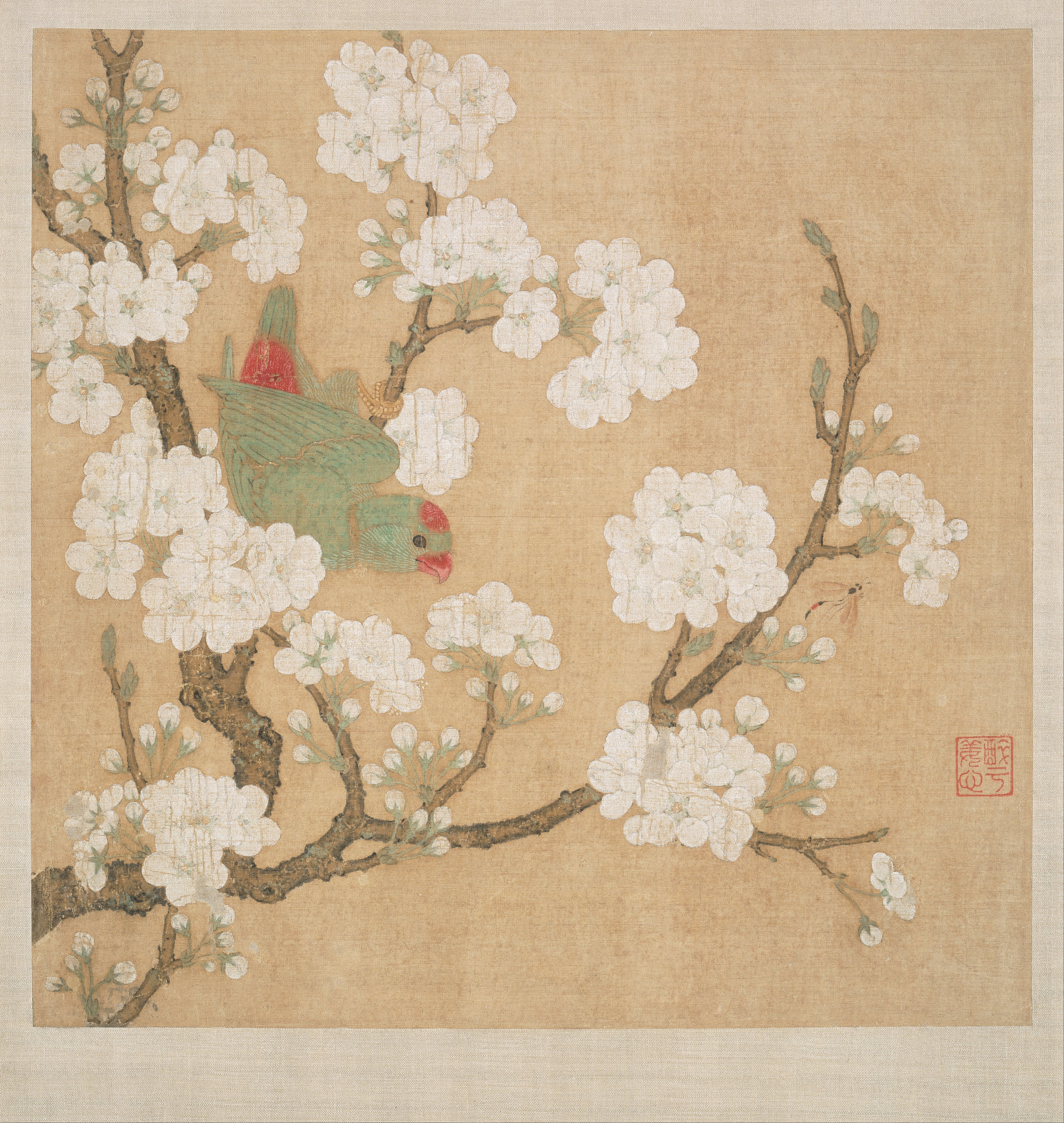
Parrot and insect among pear blossoms; by Huang Jucai; second half of the 13th century; ink and colour on silk; 27.6 × 27.6 cm; Museum of Fine Arts, Boston.

The eight hosts of Deva, Naga and Yakshi; 1454; hanging scroll, ink and color on silk; dimensions of the painting: 140.2 × 78.8 cm; Cleveland Museum of Art.

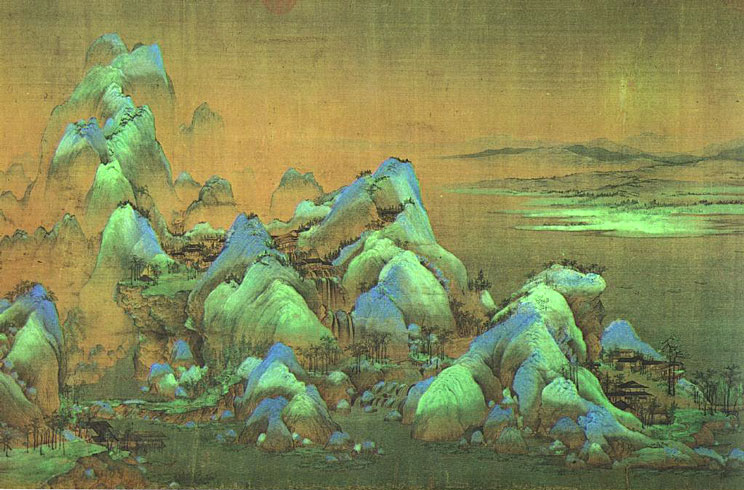
Wang Ximeng, A Thousand Li of Rivers and Mountains (千里江山圖), detail. Northern Song dynasty, c. 1113. Handscroll, ink and mineral pigments on silk. Palace Museum.

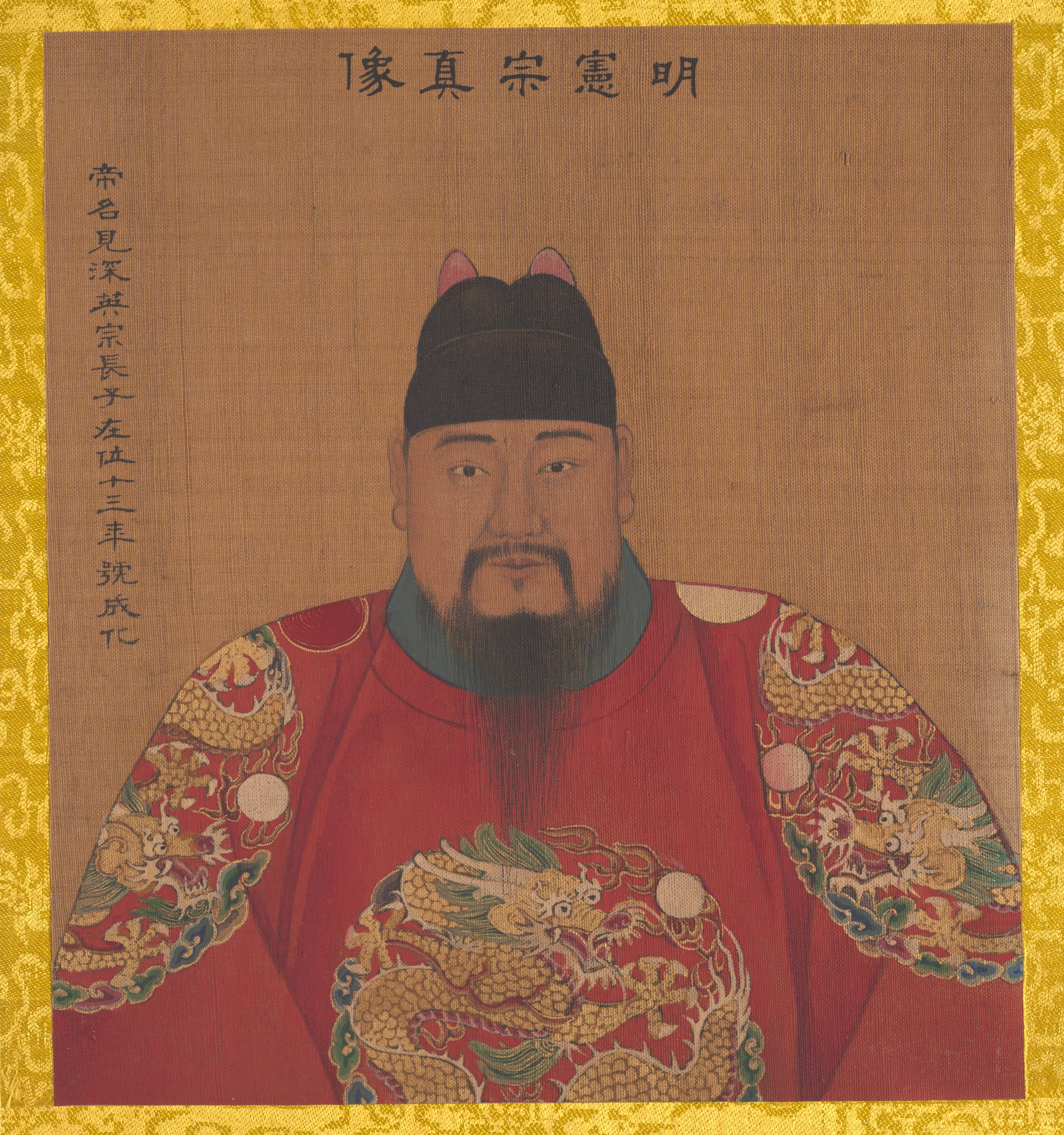
Portrait; early 20th century (?); album of twenty leaves, ink and color on silk; 28.3 × 22.2 cm; Metropolitan Museum of Art

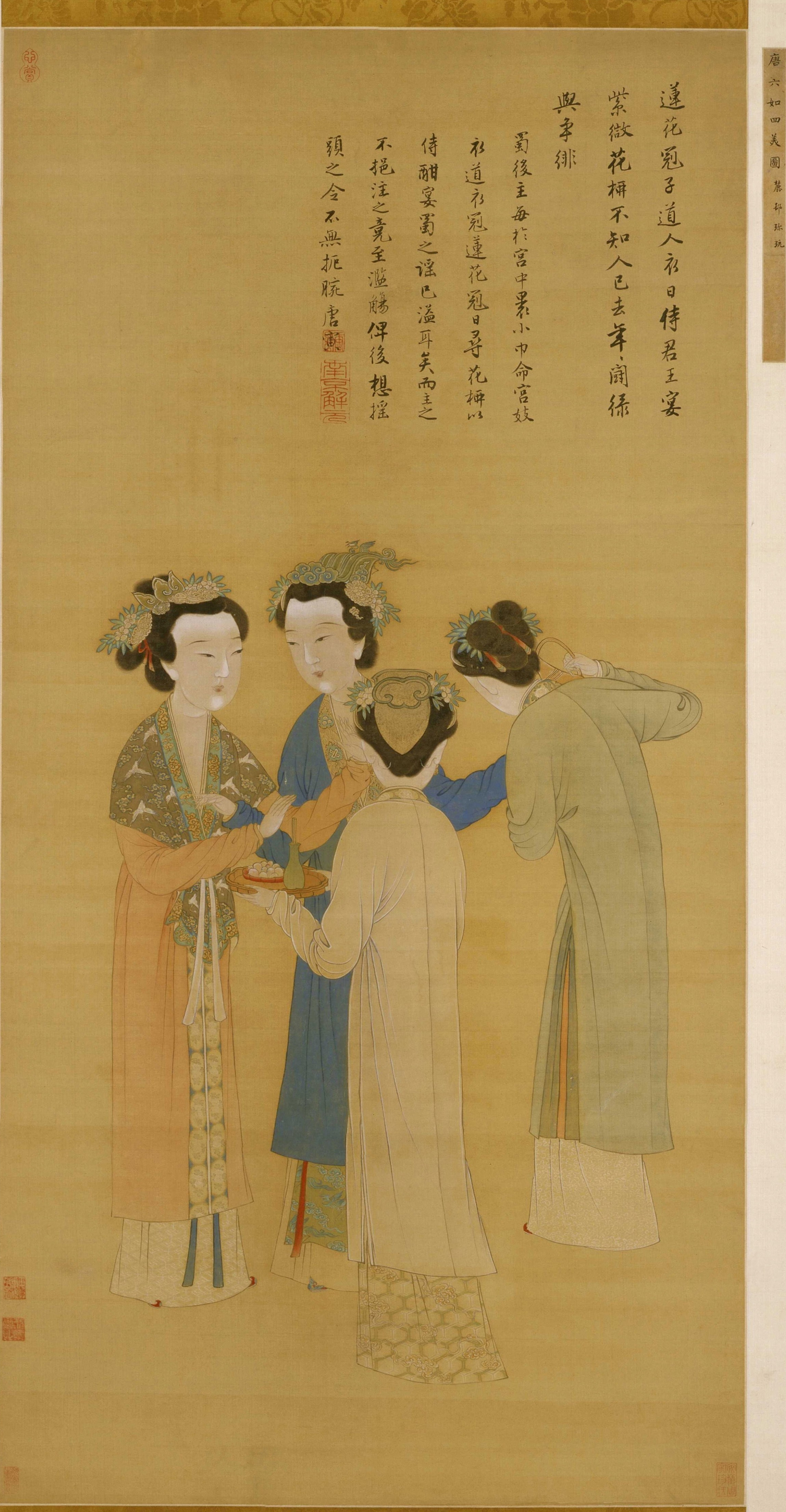
Court Ladies of the Former Shu by Tang Yin

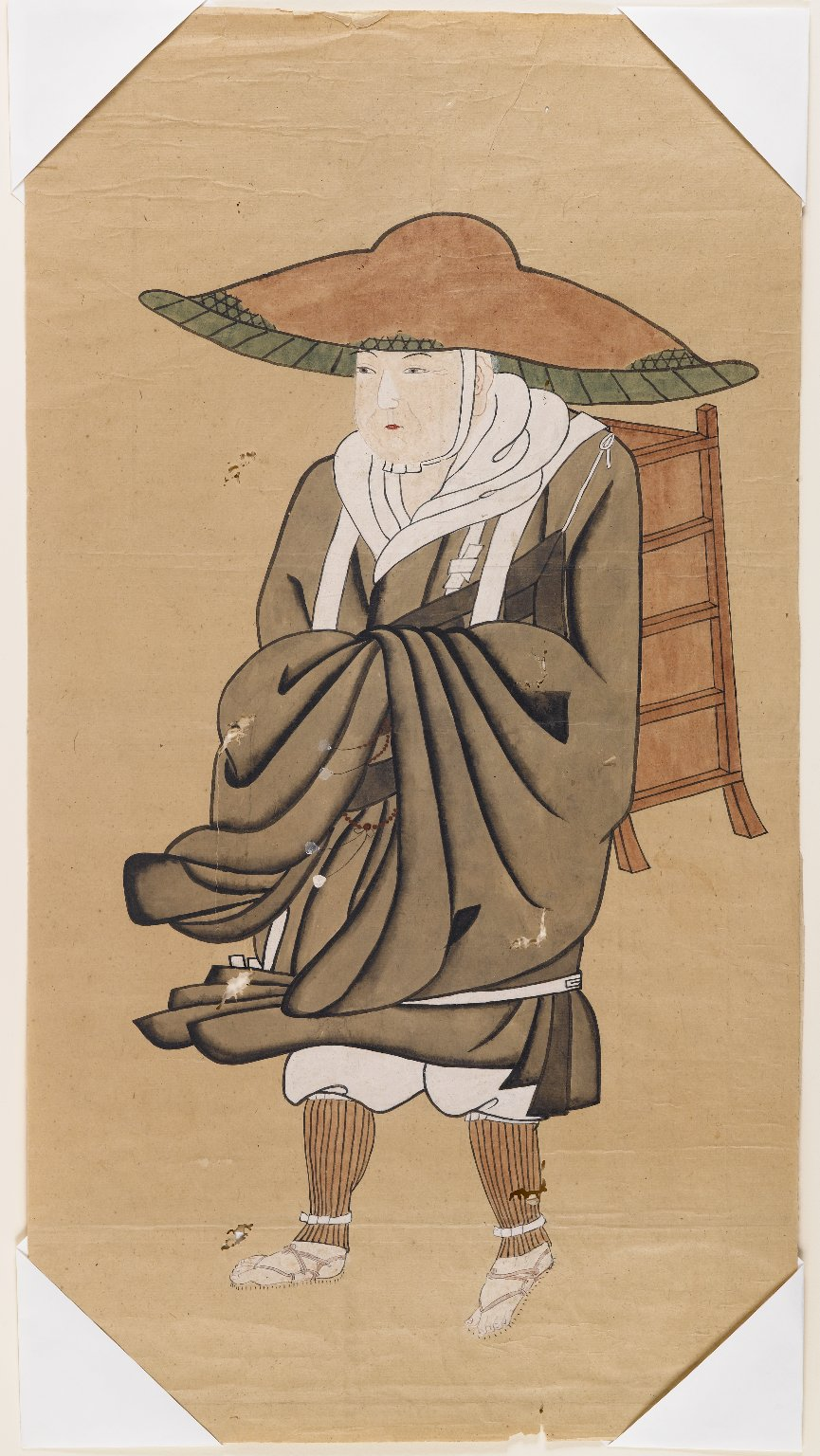
Brooklyn Museum – The Chinese Buddhist Pilgrim Xuanzang

== Sculpture ==
Chinese ritual bronzes from the Shang and Western Zhou dynasties come from a period of over a thousand years from c. 1500 BC, and have exerted a continuing influence over Chinese art. They are cast with complex patterned and zoomorphic decoration, but avoid the human figure, unlike the huge figures only recently discovered at Sanxingdui. The spectacular Terracotta Army was assembled for the tomb of Qin Shi Huang, the first emperor of a unified China from 221 to 210 BC, as a grand imperial version of the figures long placed in tombs to enable the deceased to enjoy the same lifestyle in the afterlife as when alive, replacing actual sacrifices of very early periods. Smaller figures in pottery or wood were placed in tombs for many centuries afterwards, reaching a peak of quality in the Tang dynasty tomb figures.

Native Chinese religions do not usually use cult images of deities, or even represent them, and large religious sculpture is nearly all Buddhist, dating mostly from the 4th to the 14th century, and initially using Greco-Buddhist models arriving via the Silk Road. Buddhism is also the context of all large portrait sculpture; in total contrast to some other areas in medieval China even painted images of the emperor were regarded as private. Imperial tombs have spectacular avenues of approach lined with real and mythological animals on a scale matching Egypt, and smaller versions decorate temples and palaces. Small Buddhist figures and groups were produced to a very high quality in a range of media, as was relief decoration of all sorts of objects, especially in metalwork and jade. Sculptors of all sorts were regarded as artisans and very few names are recorded.

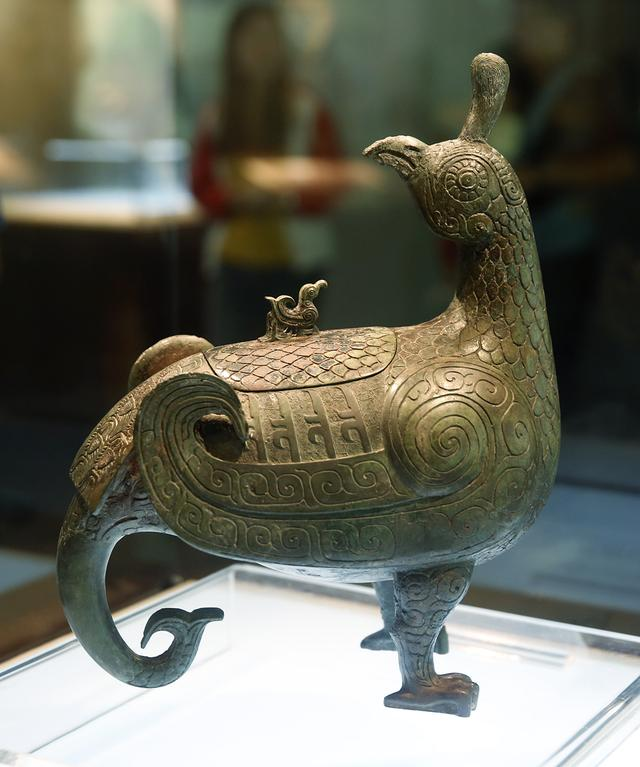
Bird-shaped zun vessel of the Marquis of Jin, c. 11th–10th century BCE. Shanxi Museum

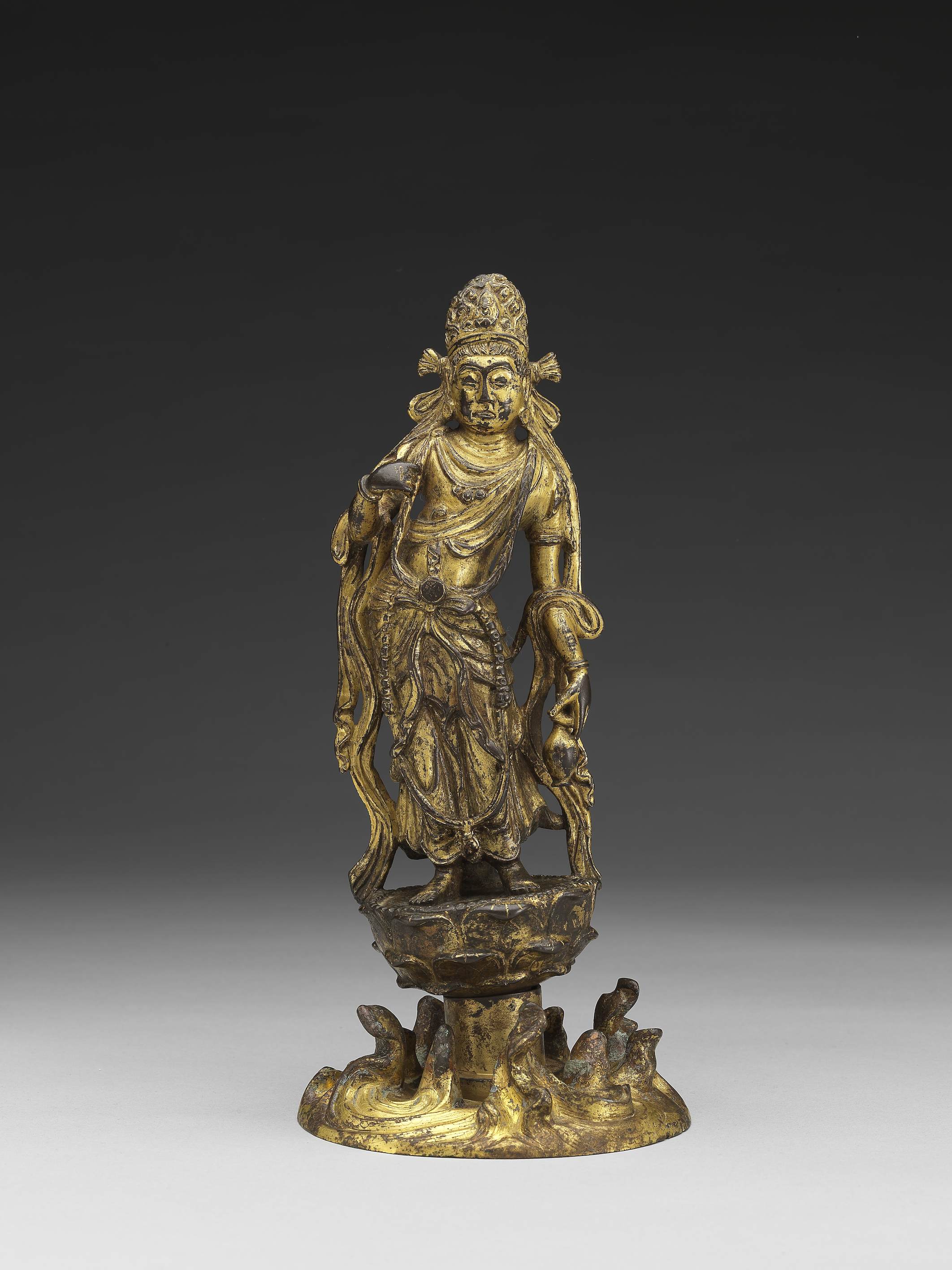
Gilt bronze standing figure of Avalokiteśvara (Guanyin), Tang dynasty (618–907). National Palace Museum

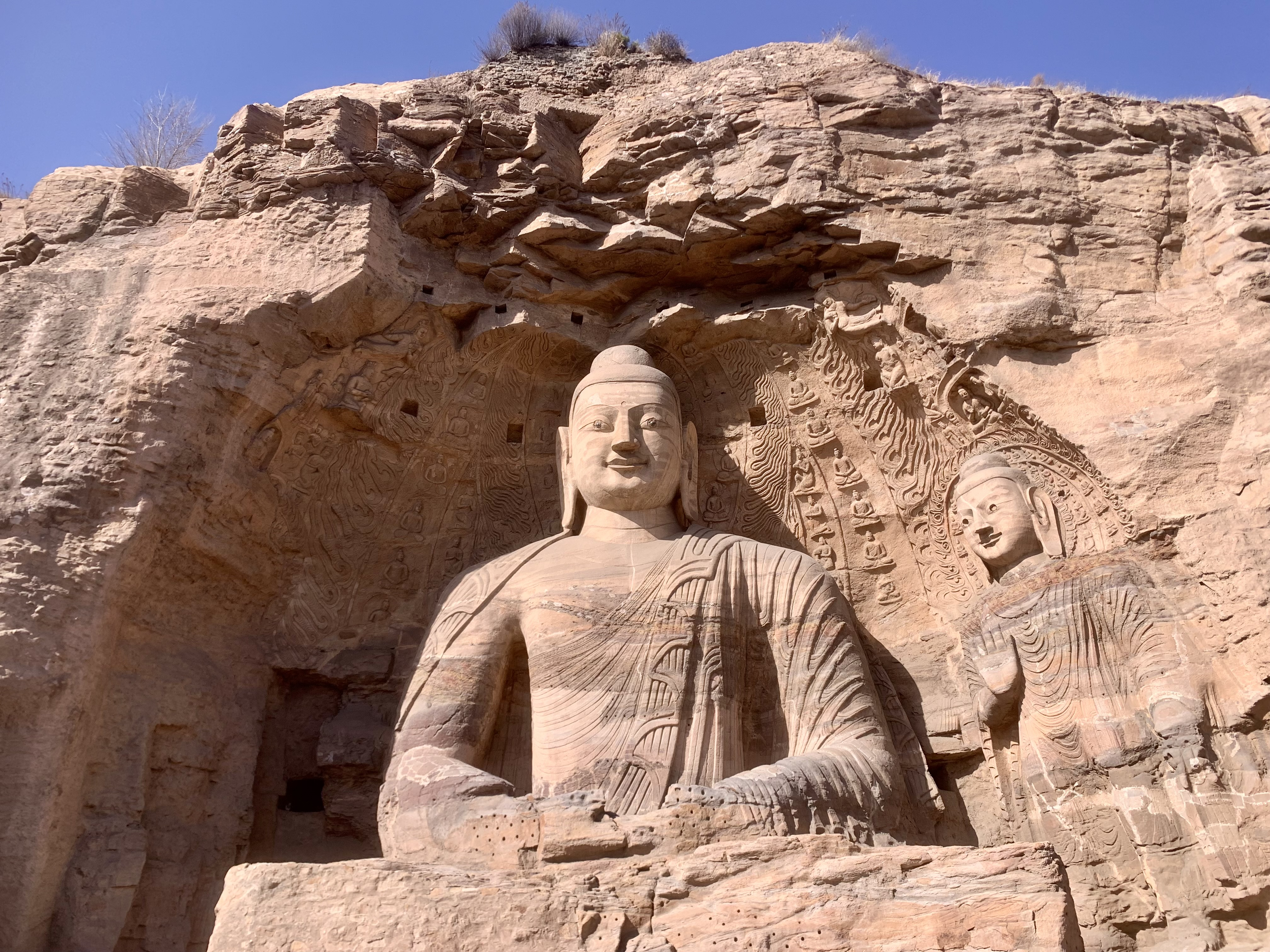
Colossal seated Buddha, Cave 20, Yungang Grottoes, Datong, Shanxi. Northern Wei dynasty (5th century)

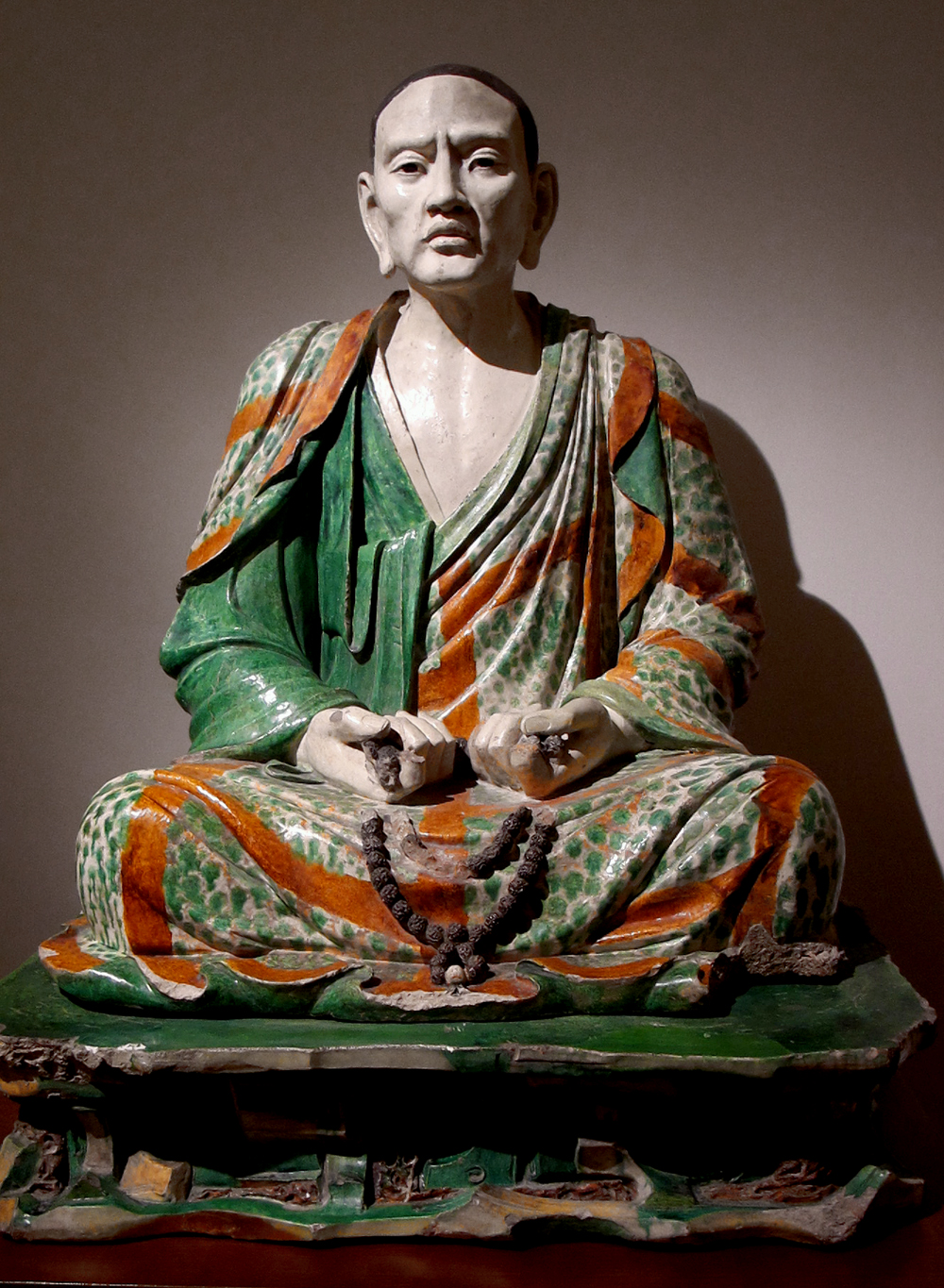
Statue of the luohan Tamrabhadra, one of the group of glazed pottery luohans from Yixian; 10th–13th century; glazed terracotta; height: 123 cm; Guimet Museum

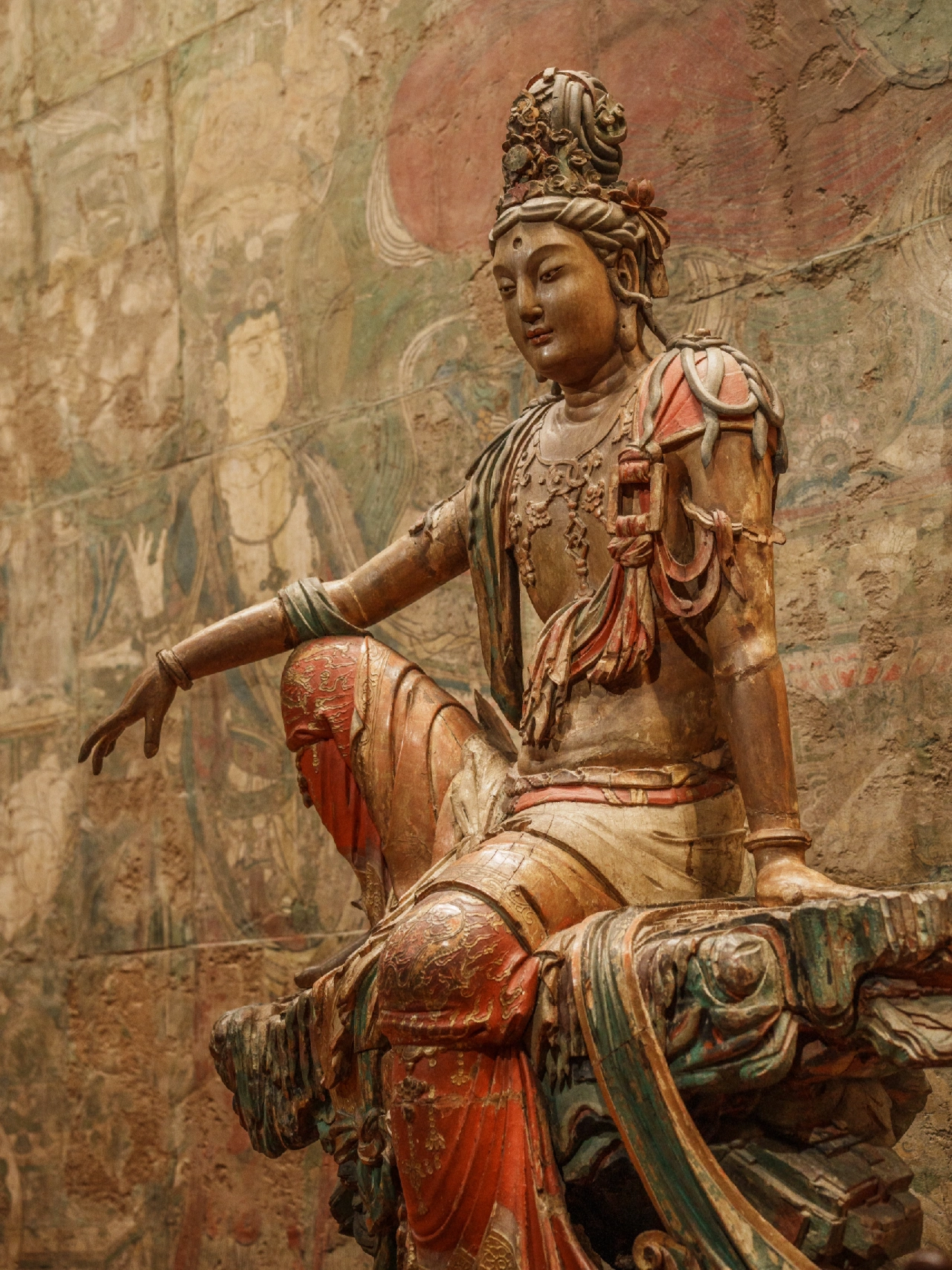
Water-Moon Guanyin, Liao dynasty (11th–12th century). Wood with polychrome and gold. Nelson-Atkins Museum of Art

Caparisoned elephant, Liao dynasty. Cleveland Museum of Art

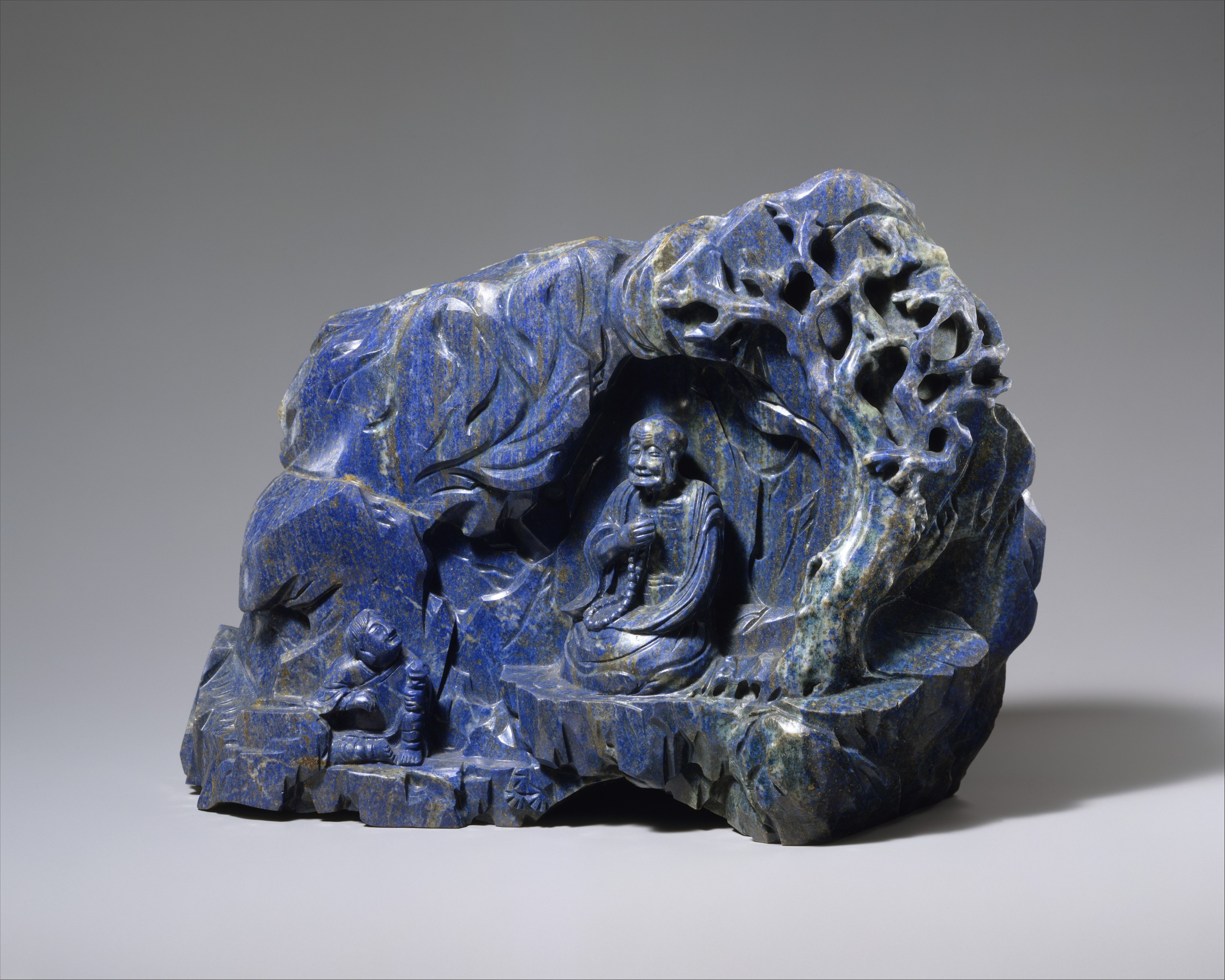
Seated luohan; 18th–19th century; lapis lazuli; height: 18.1 cm, width: 25.4 cm; Metropolitan Museum of Art

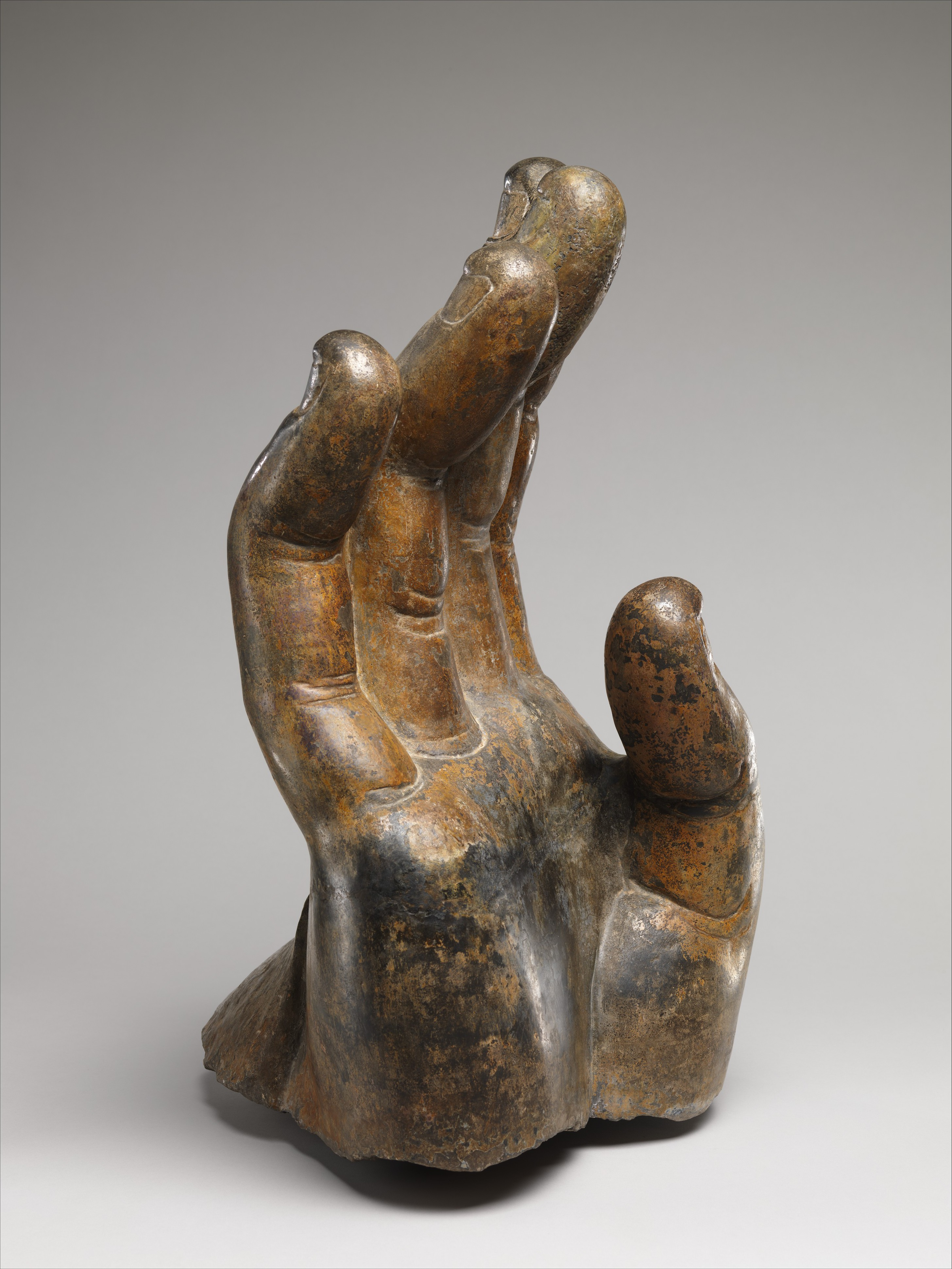
Limestone right hand of Buddha from Northern Xiangtangshan Caves, Northern Qi dynasty (550–577). Metropolitan Museum of Art

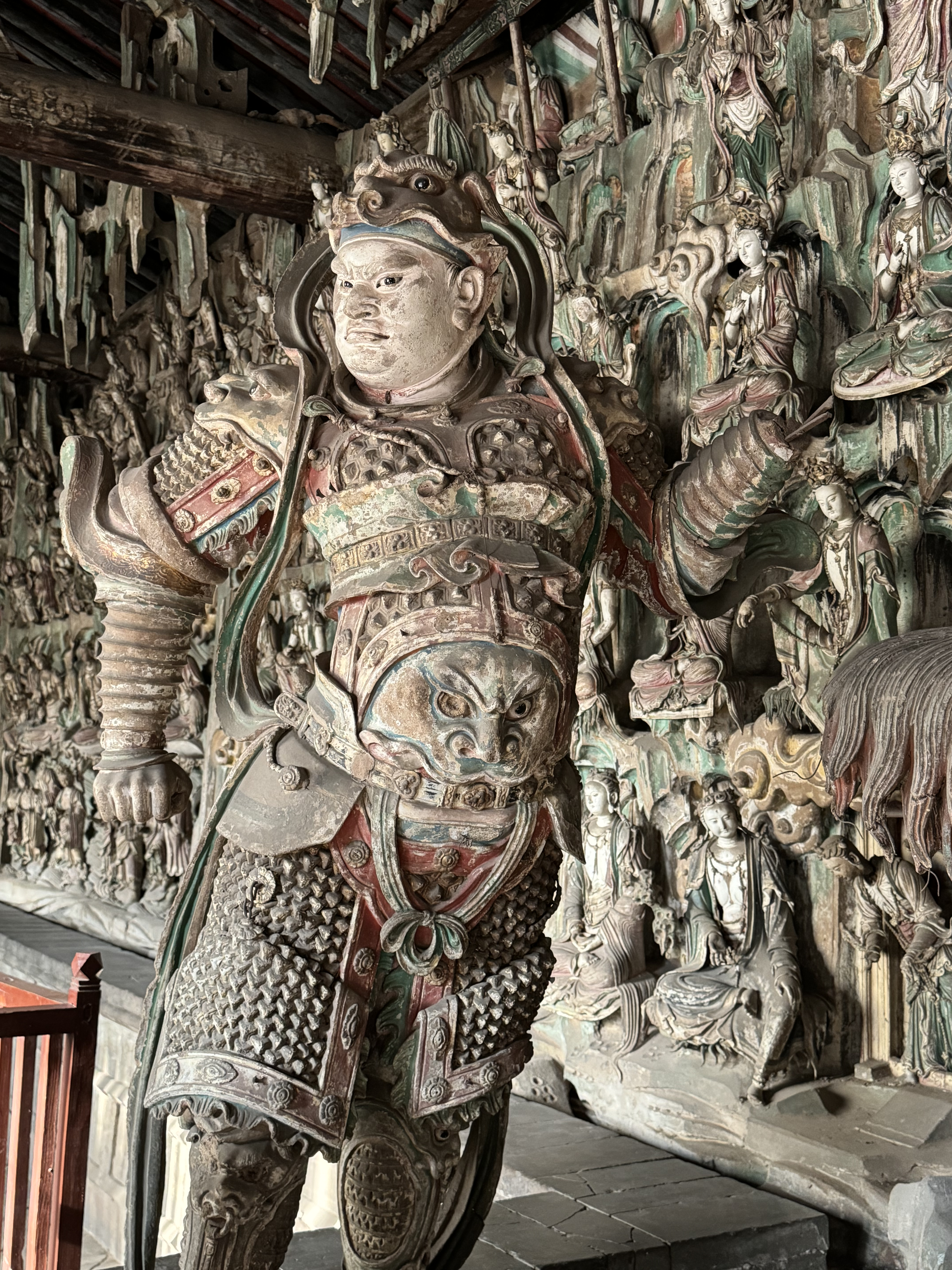
Weituo (Skanda), Painted clay over a wooden armature, Ming dynasty (1368–1644), Thousand Buddha Hall, Shuanglin Temple, Pingyao, Shanxi

Head of a terracotta horse from the Terracotta Army of Qin Shi Huang, Qin dynasty (221–206 BC), from Lintong, Shaanxi

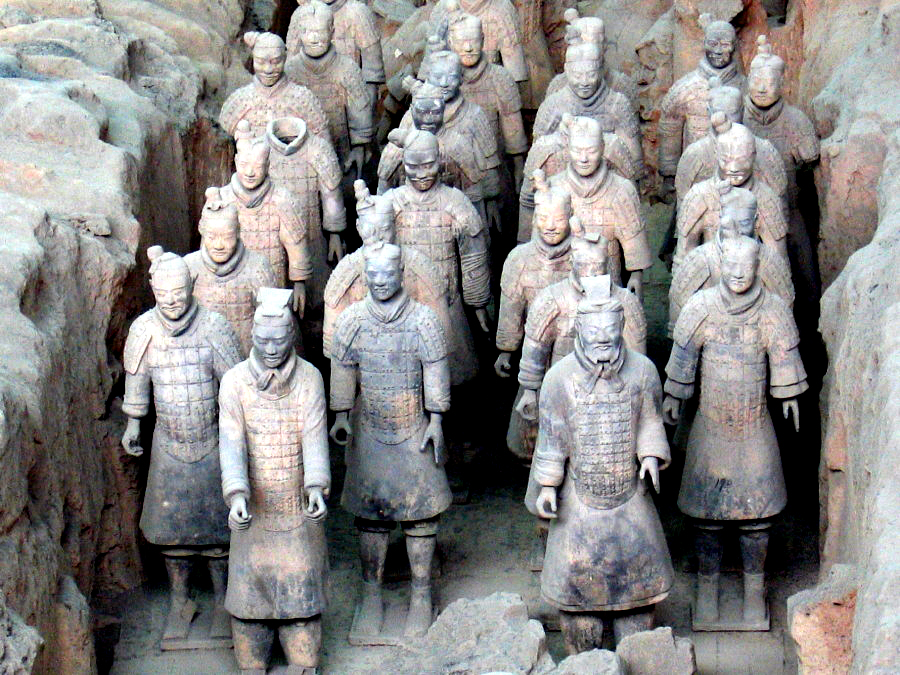
Terracotta warriors in formation in Pit 1 of the Terracotta Army, Lintong, Shaanxi. Qin dynasty, c. 210 BC.

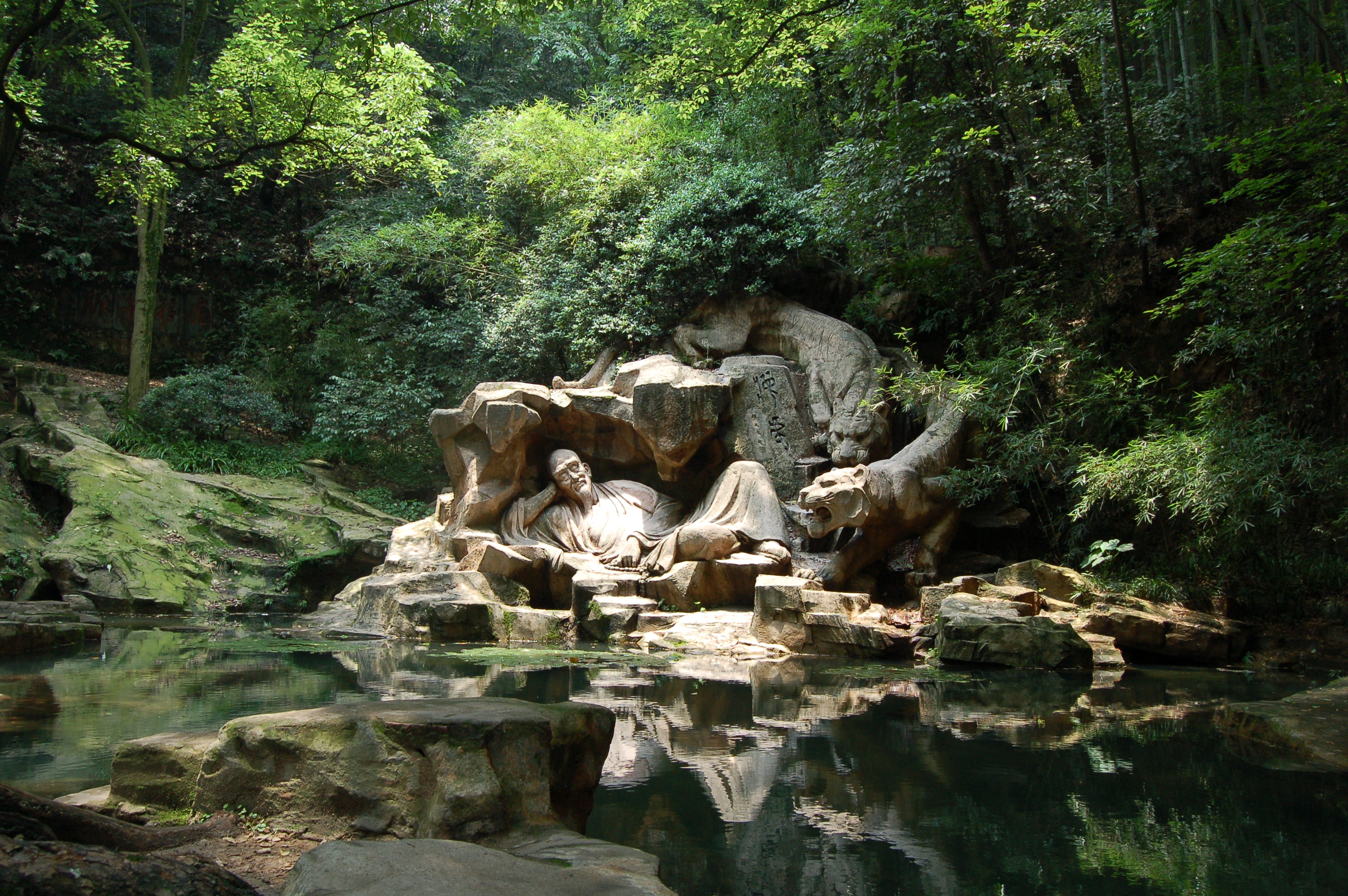
Hupao Spring in Hangzhou, Zhejiang. Under the scenic name Hupao Mengquan (“Dreaming of the Tiger Spring at Hupao”), it is one of the New Ten Scenes of West Lake.

== Ceramics ==
Chinese ceramic ware shows a continuous development since the pre-dynastic periods, and is one of the most significant forms of Chinese art. China is richly endowed with the raw materials needed for making ceramics. The first types of ceramics were made during the Palaeolithic era, and in later periods range from construction materials such as bricks and tiles, to hand-built pottery vessels fired in bonfires or kilns, to the sophisticated Chinese porcelain wares made for the imperial court. Most later Chinese ceramics, even of the finest quality, were made on an industrial scale, thus very few individual potters or painters are known. Many of the most renowned workshops were owned by or reserved for the Emperor, and large quantities of ceramics were exported as diplomatic gifts or for trade from an early date.

The Song dynasty (960–1279) is often regarded as the golden age of Chinese ceramics, particularly for its refined monochrome wares. The "Five Great Kilns", Ru, Guan, Ge, Jun, and Ding, produced wares for the imperial court that have been prized by collectors for centuries.

With the advent of the Ming Dynasty (1368-1644), Chinese ceramic art ushered in another golden age. Supported by the imperial court, the official kilns were defined by rigorous craftsmanship and strict regulations. Ming Dynasty blue-and-white porcelain, notable for its balanced blue glaze and dynamic patterns, became a signature category. Themes included landscapes, flowers and birds, figures, and auspicious designs. This not only highlighted royal grandeur but also integrated folk aesthetics. Additionally, underglaze red porcelain, using copper for its vivid color, stands out for its firing difficulty and rarity. In the late Ming Dynasty, polychrome porcelain emerged, introducing rich colors, strong contrasts, and elaborate decorations. This innovation broke away from monochrome styles and advanced ceramic decorative art.

As China entered the modern era, ceramic craftsmanship continued to evolve, blending traditional manual skills with modern industrial technology. Despite these changes, Jing De Zhen's role as the porcelain capital remains unchanged. It preserves the essence of traditional ceramic craftsmanship and classic production techniques, such as blue-and-white porcelain and powder enamel, while embracing innovation through modern design concepts. This enables the development of ceramic works that suit contemporary lifestyles and tastes. In this new context, Jing De Zhen serves as both the core base for China's ceramic production and research and a key platform for cultural exchange between Chinese and foreign ceramics. Traditional handcrafted kilns coexist with modern ceramic enterprises, retaining time-honored processes such as "throwing, glazing, and firing" while integrating modern technology to optimize processes and improve quality. Through continuous innovation and inheritance, Chinese ceramic art maintains its unique charm, becoming a cultural bridge connecting the past, present, and world.

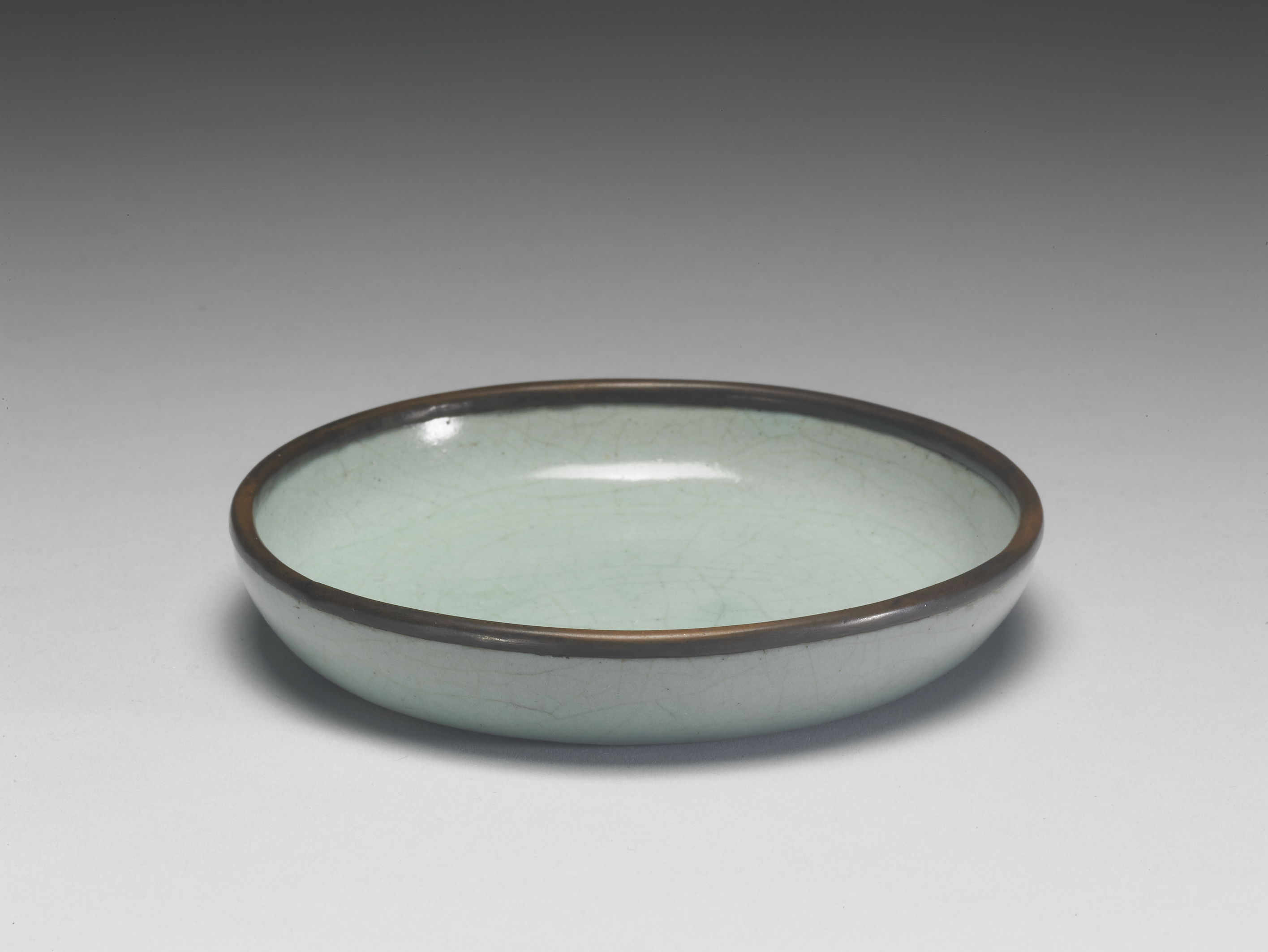
Ru ware brush washer with inscription (汝窯青瓷奉華款洗), Northern Song dynasty, late 11th–early 12th century. National Palace Museum.

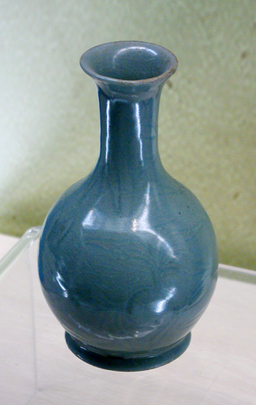
Gooseneck vase (汝窯天藍釉刻花鵝頸瓶) with sky-blue glaze and incised floral decoration, Ru ware, Northern Song dynasty, c. 1086–1125 CE, Henan Museum

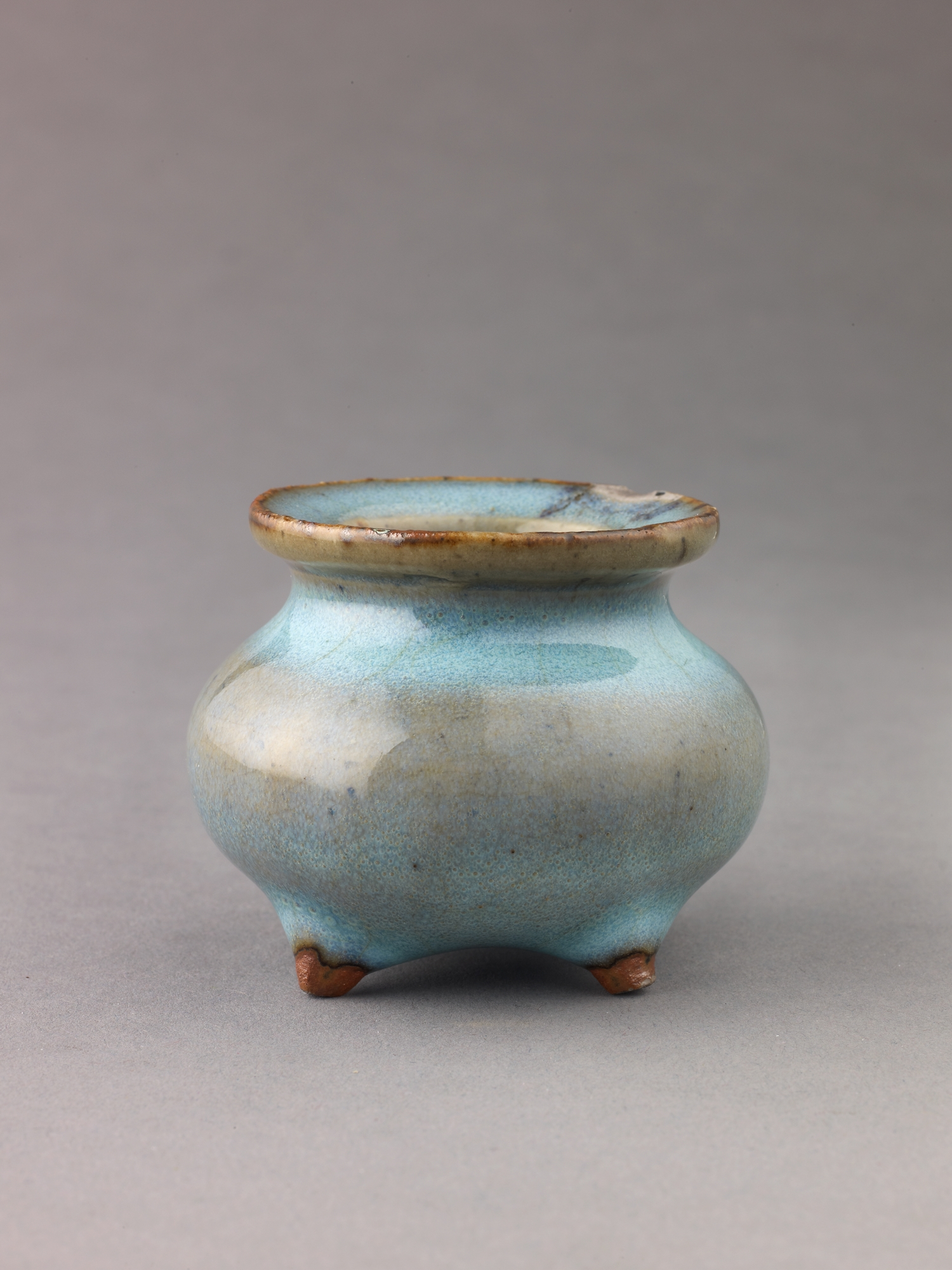
Jun ware miniature incense burner with blue glaze, Song–Yuan dynasty (12th–14th century). Metropolitan Museum of Art

Jun ware vase, Qing dynasty (1644–1912), Cleveland Museum of Art

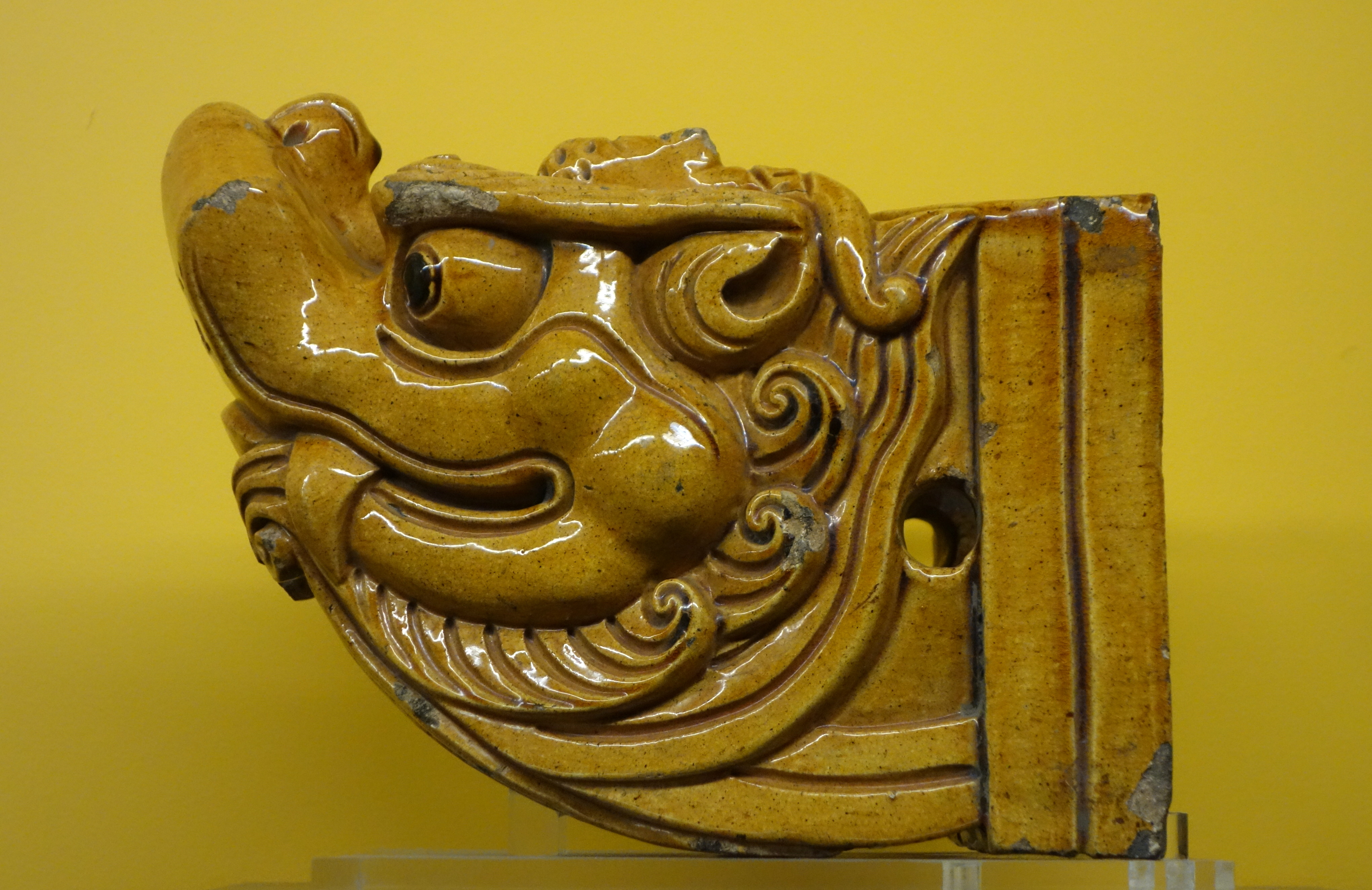
Glazed ceramic taoshou (套獸, corner beam finial) from the Old Summer Palace, Qing dynasty, Qianlong period (1736–1796). Royal Ontario Museum

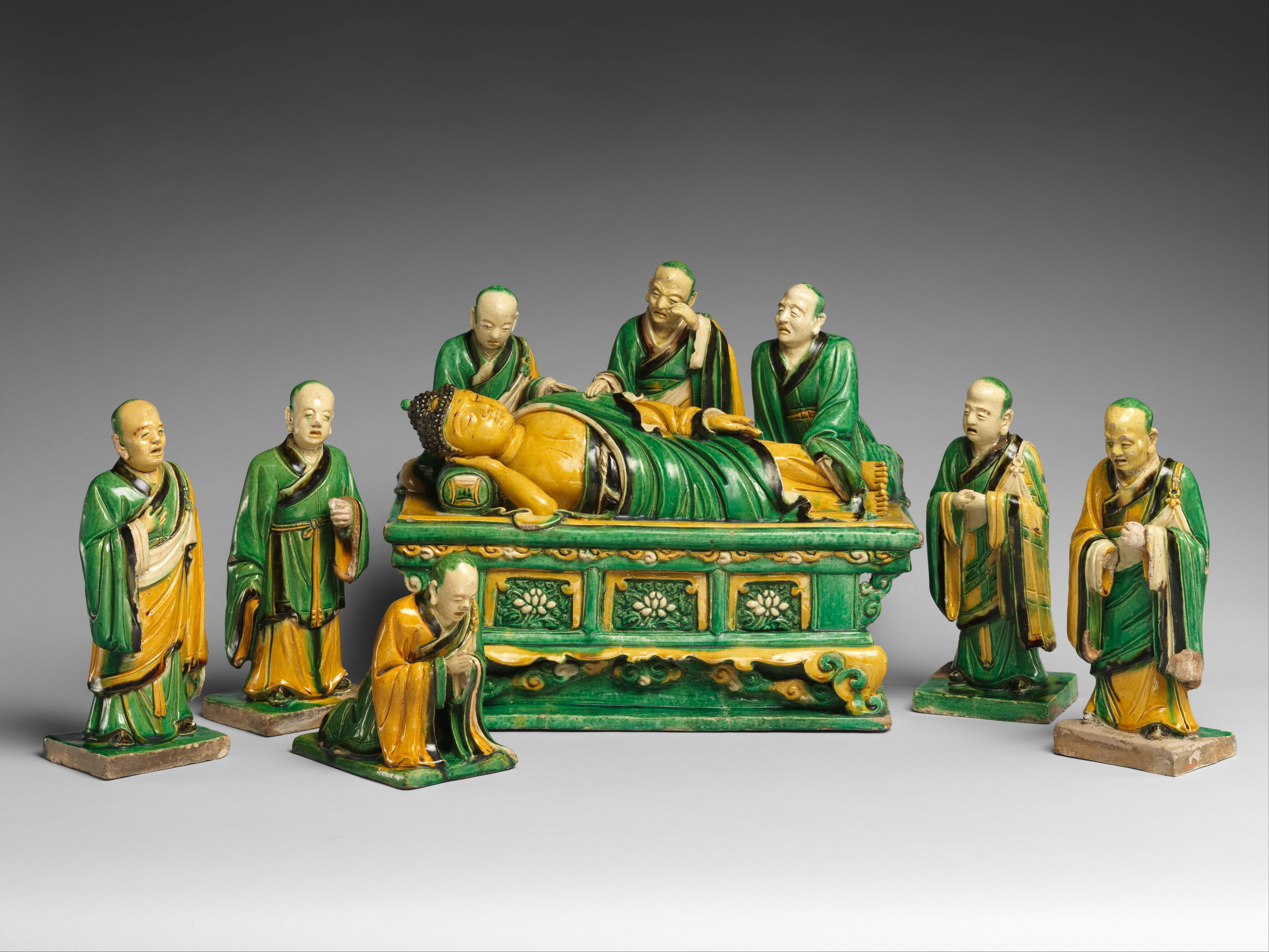
Buddhist figurines; by Qiao Bin; circa 1503; glazed pottery; various dimensions; Metropolitan Museum of Art

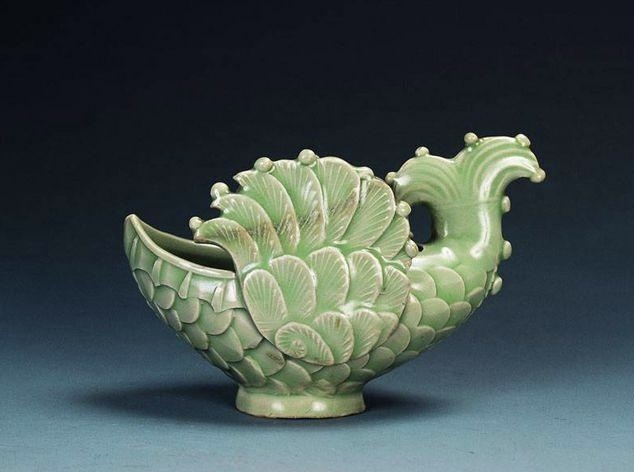
Early Yaozhou ware from the Five Dynasties period, 10th century AD

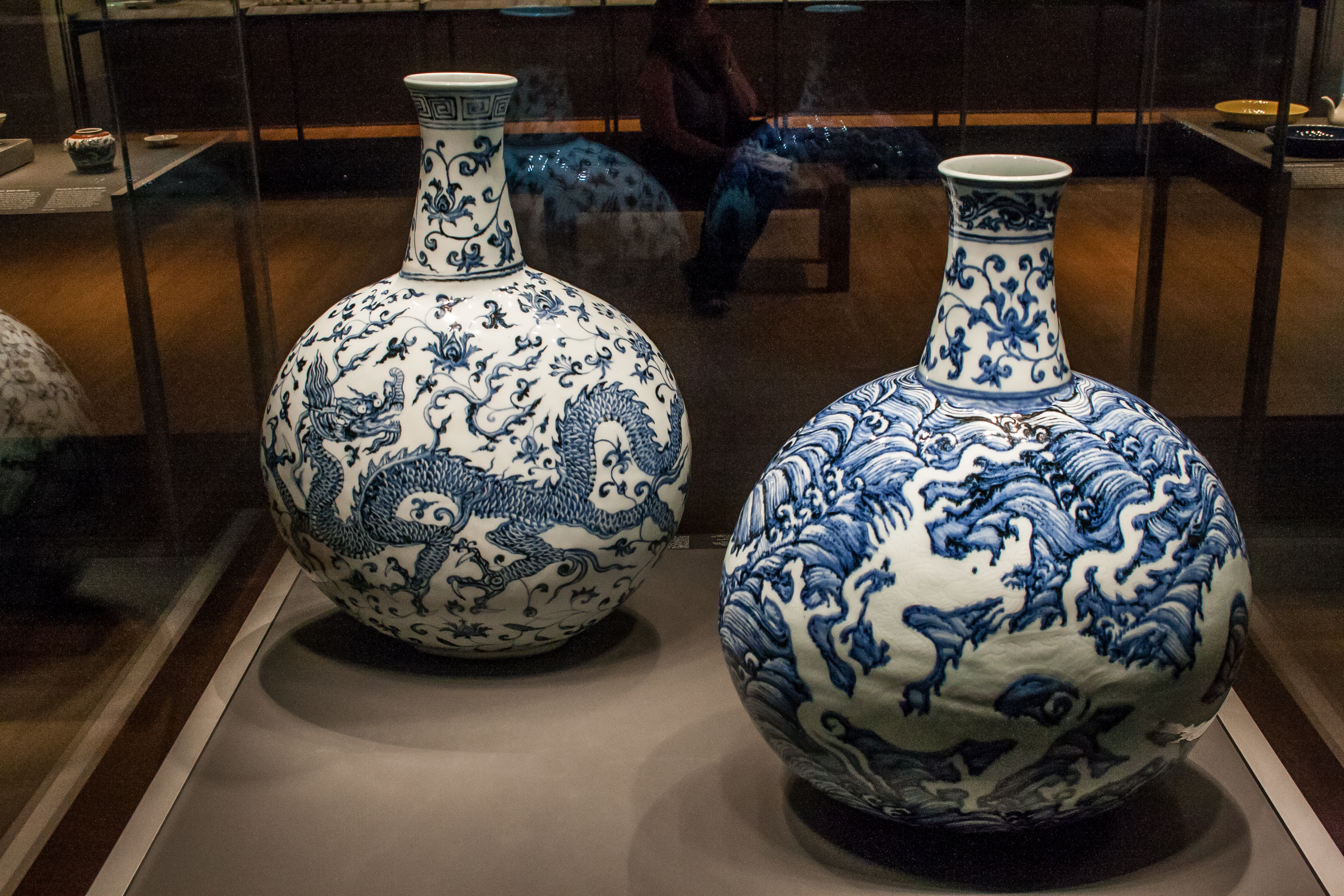
Two flasks with dragons; 1403–1424; underglaze blue porcelain; height (the left one): 47.8 cm, height (the right one): 44.6 cm; British Museum

Blue-and-white flask with dragons and phoenixes, Yuan dynasty. Aurora Museum, Shanghai

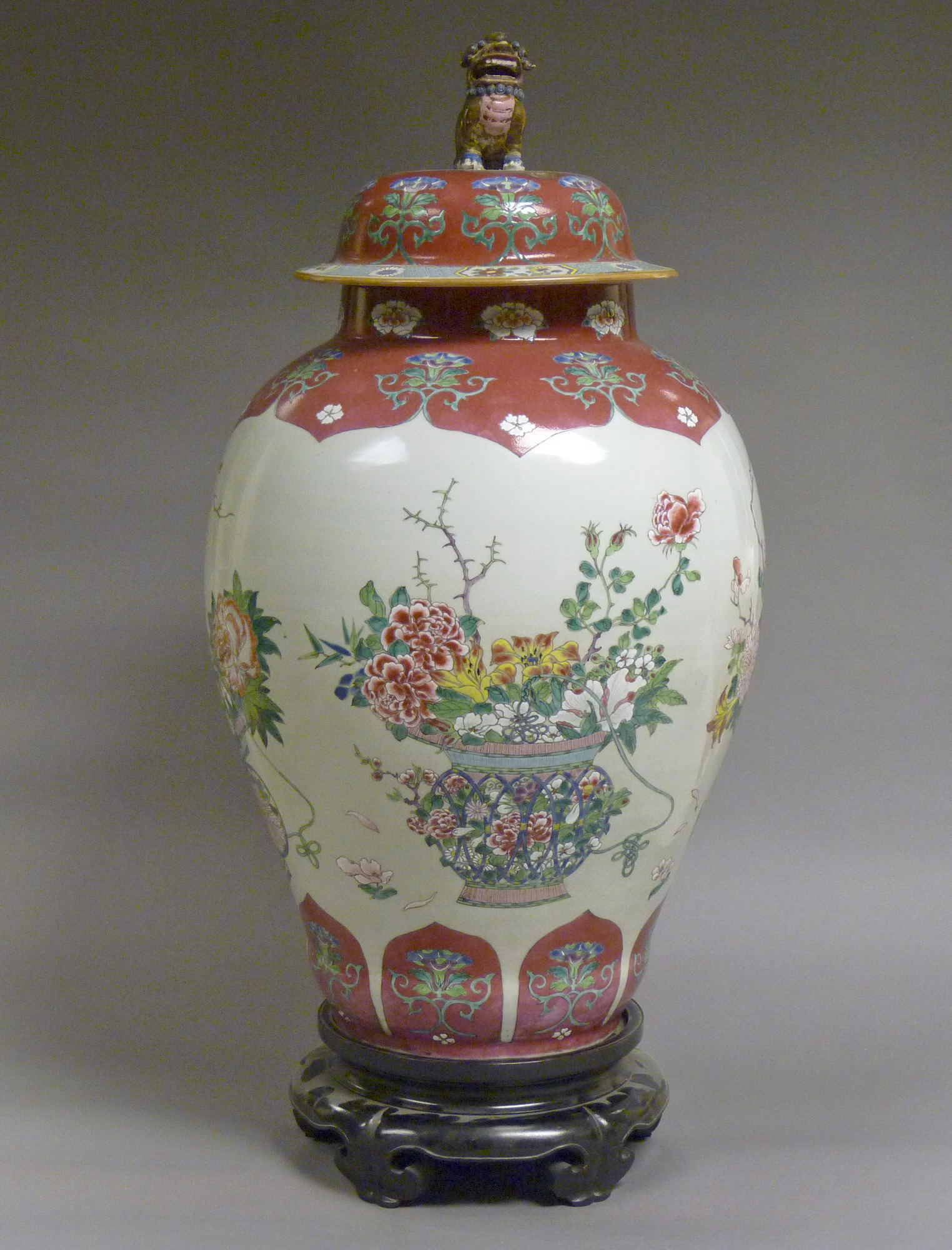
Jar: 18th century; porcelain painted in overglaze famille rose enamels; height: 61 cm; Metropolitan Museum of Art

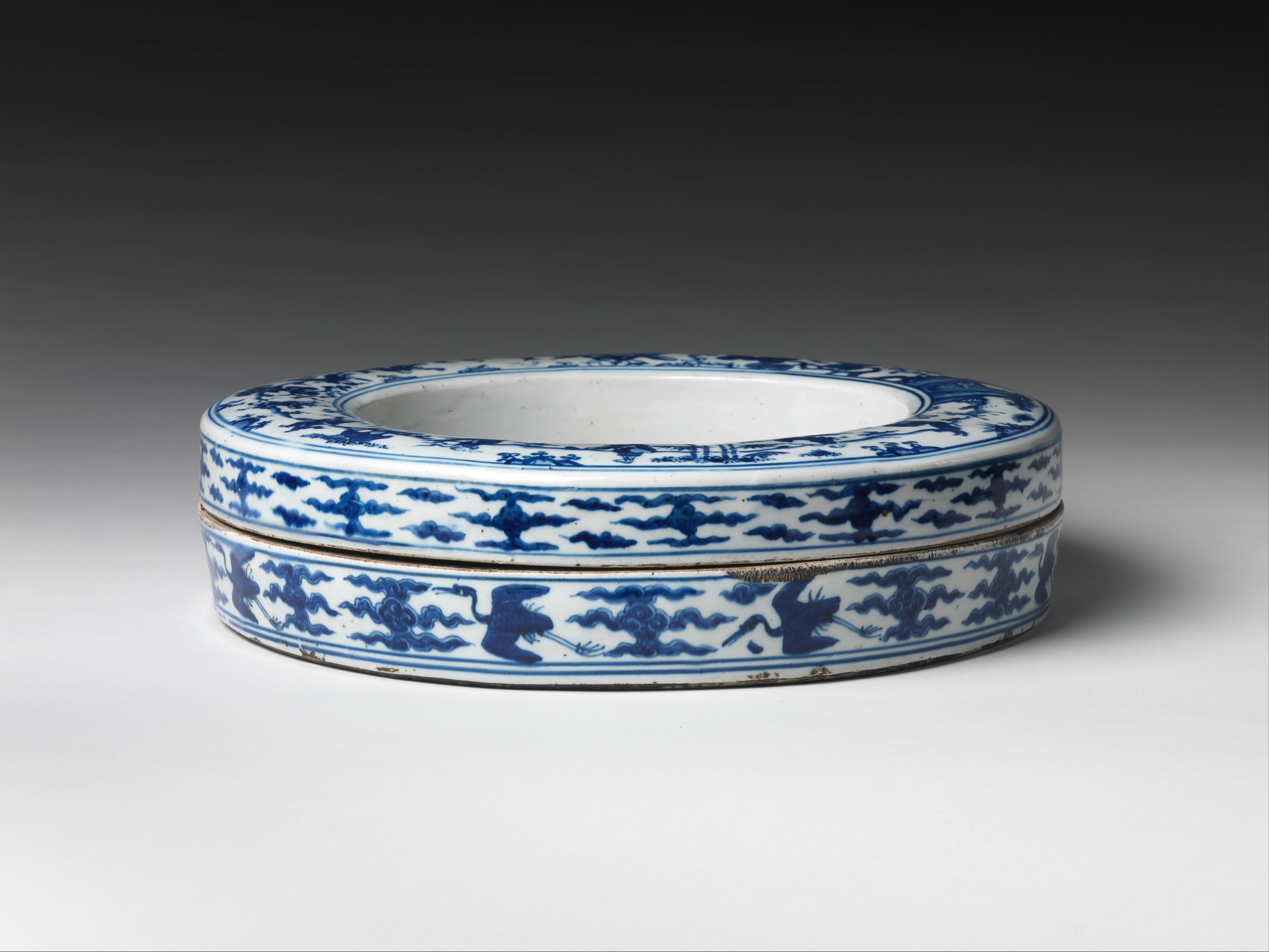
Jingdezhen blue and white porcelain court bead box (chao zhu he 朝珠盒), Ming dynasty, Jiajing period (1522–1566). Metropolitan Museum of Art

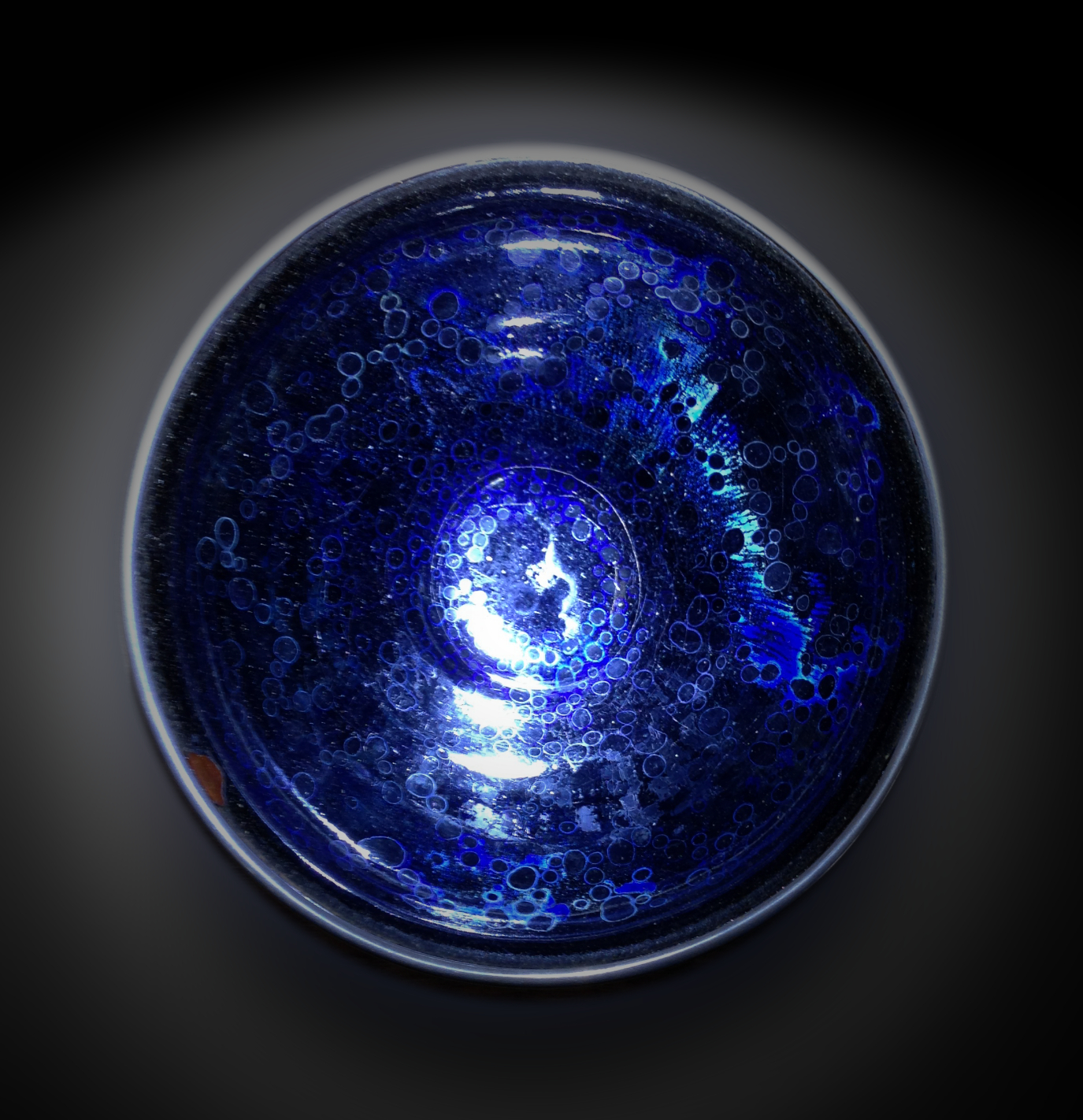
Yohen tenmoku (曜変天目) tea bowl, Southern Song dynasty (1127–1279). Seikadō Bunko Art Museum, Tokyo

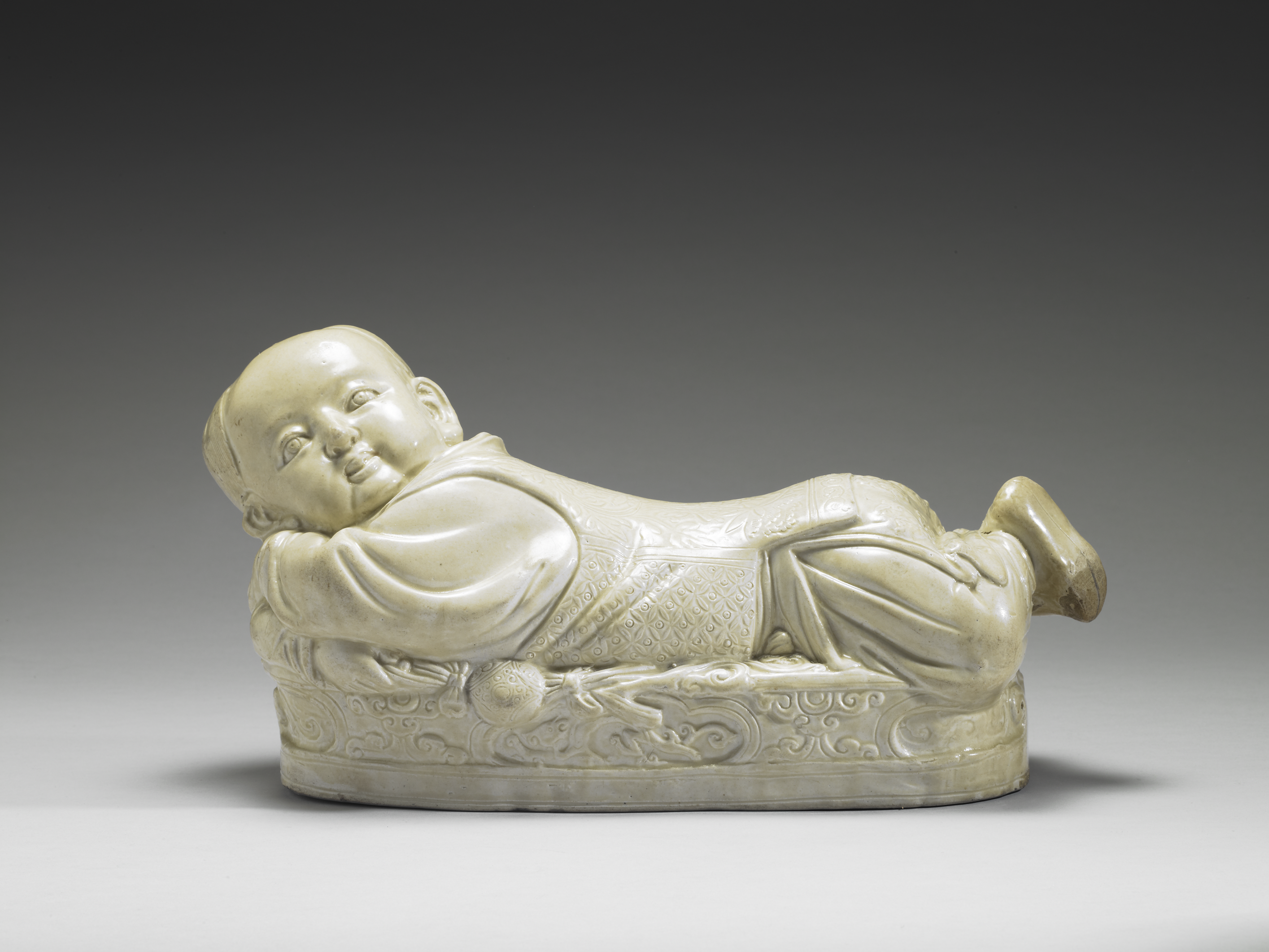
Ding ware pillow in the shape of a recumbent child, Northern Song dynasty (12th century). National Palace Museum

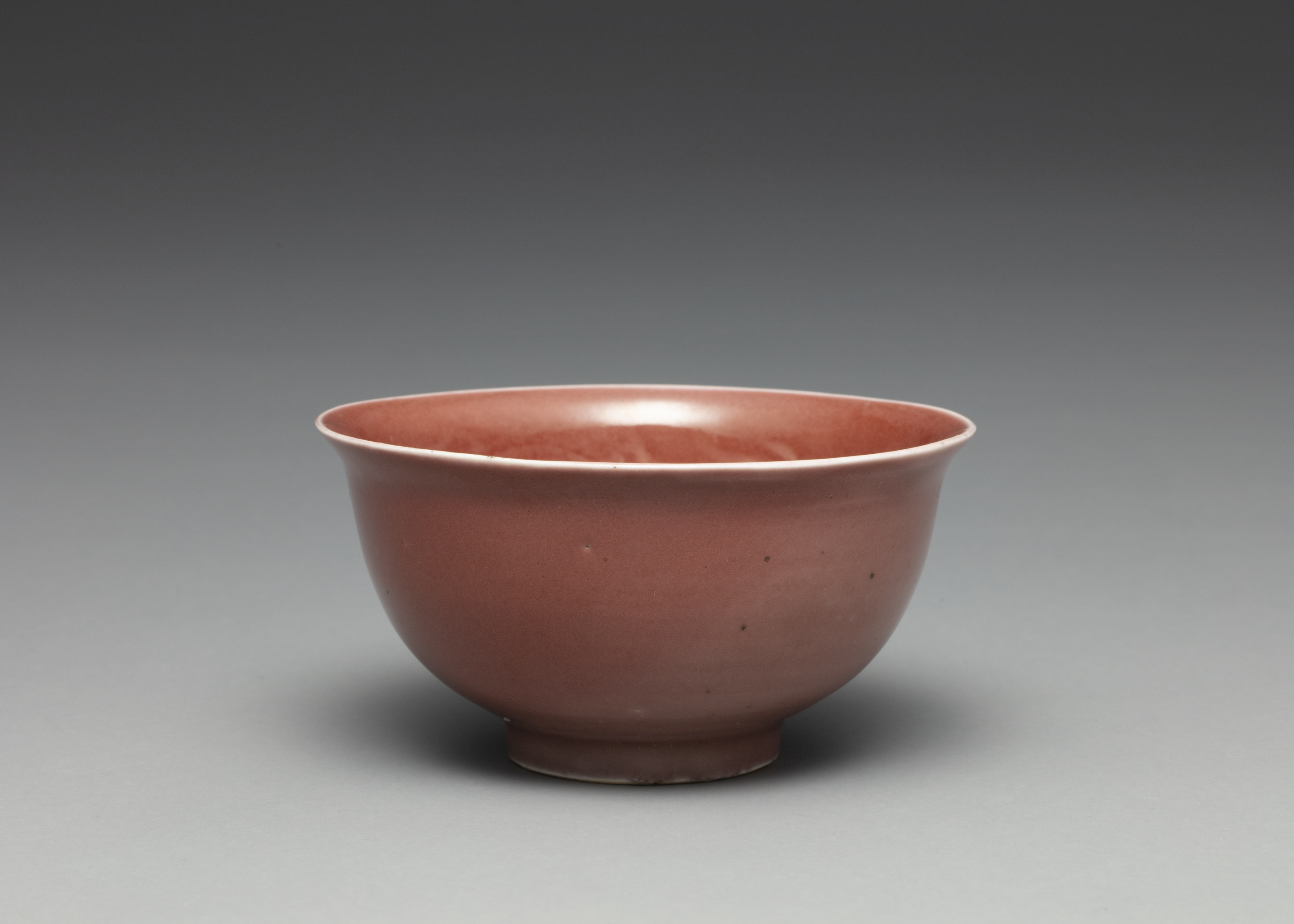
Red-glazed bowl with incised dragon decoration, Ming dynasty, Hongwu period (before 1398). National Palace Museum

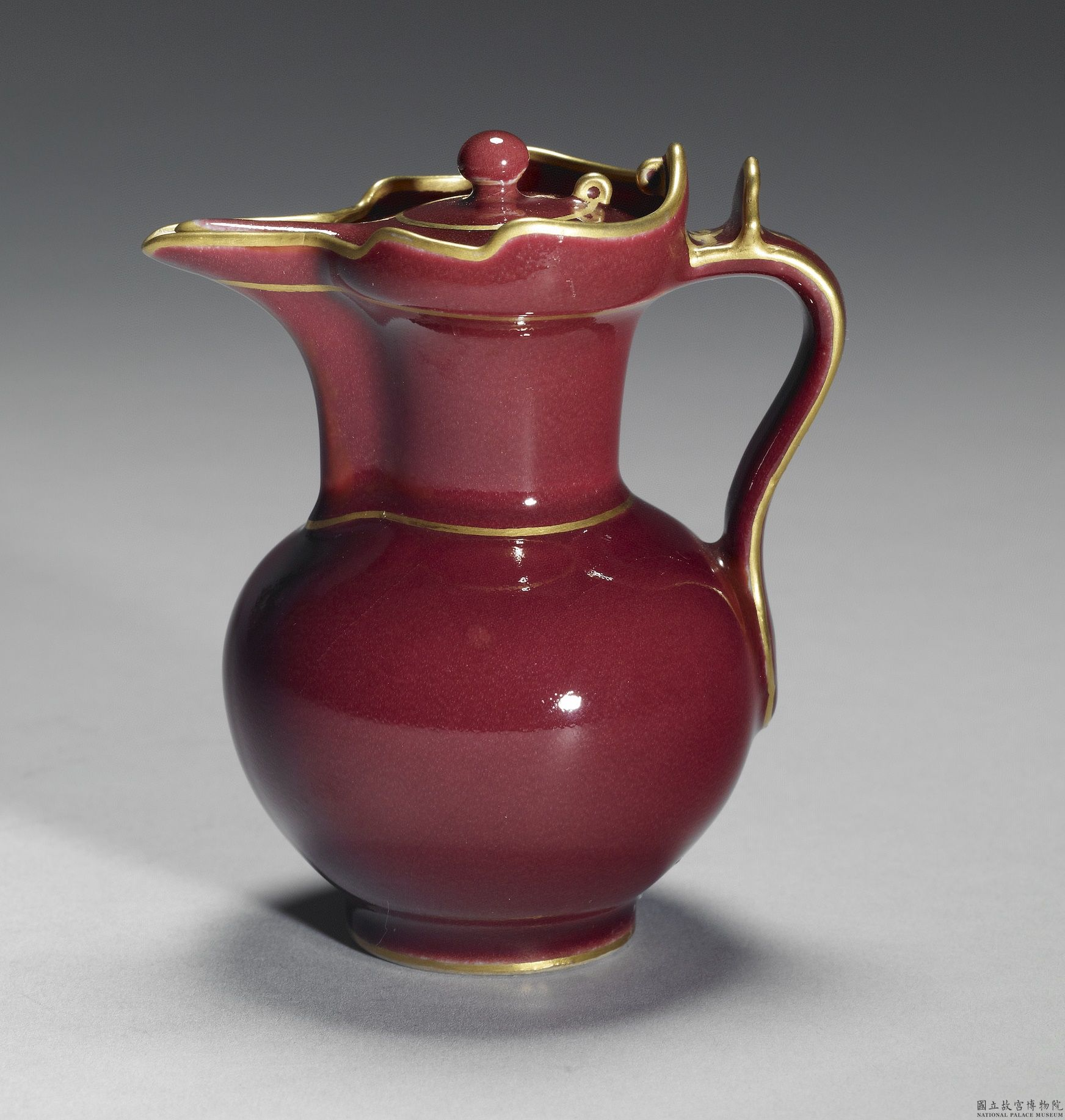
Ruby red glazed monk's cap ewer (sengmaophu), Ming dynasty, Xuande mark and period (1426–1435). National Palace Museum

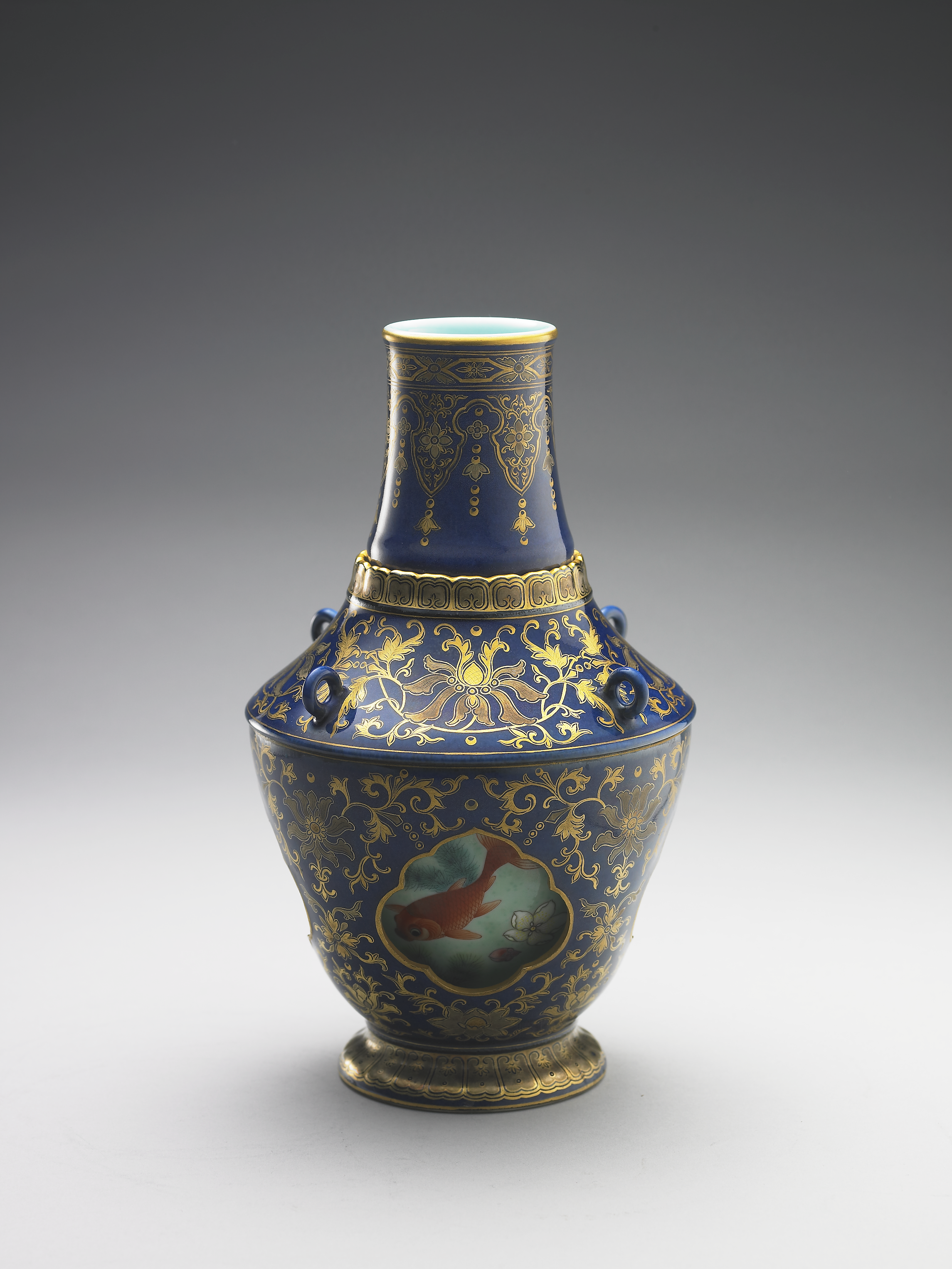
Revolving vase with goldfish design on cobalt blue glaze with gilt tracing, Qing dynasty, Qianlong period (1736–1795). National Palace Museum

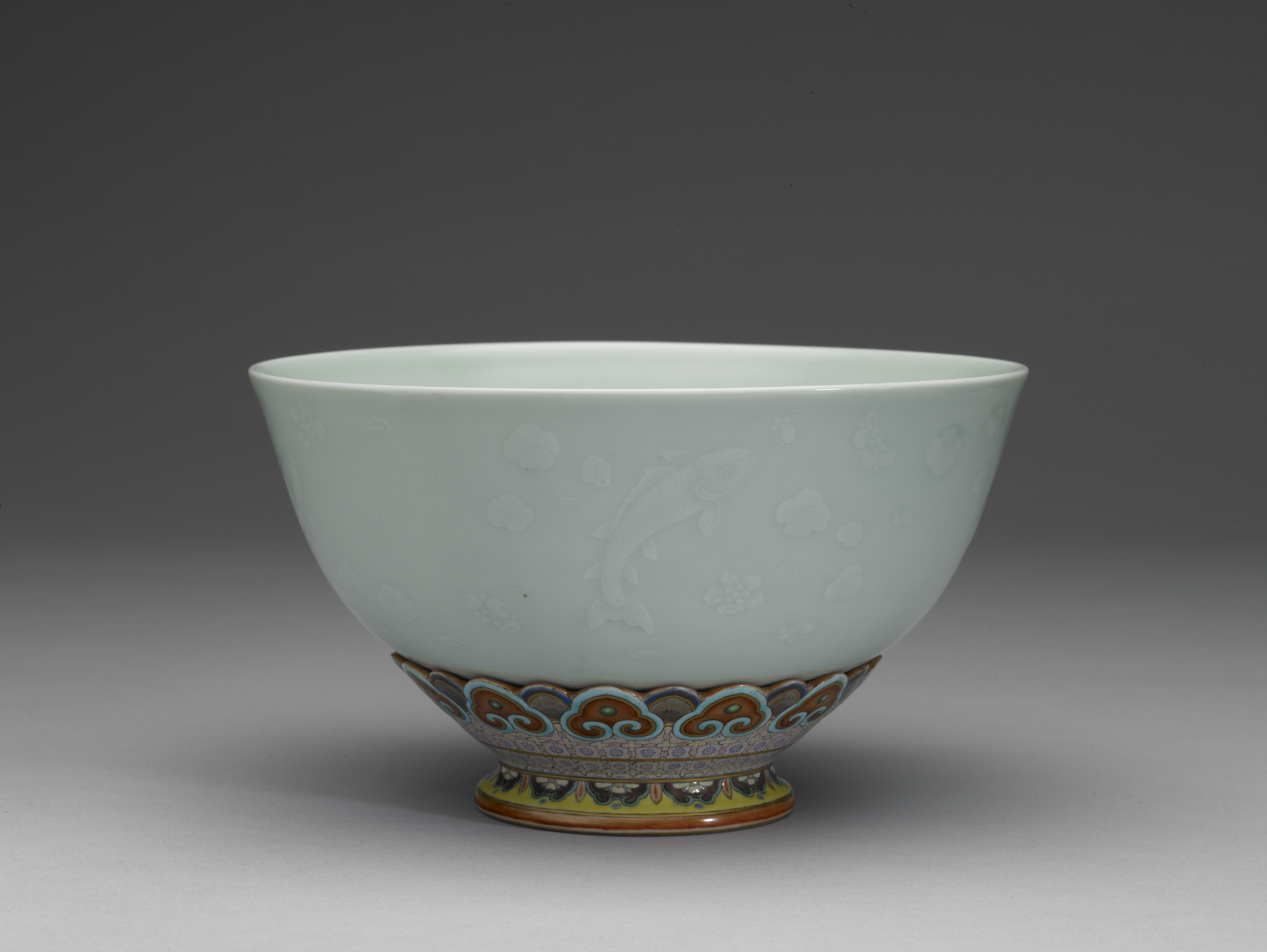
Rotating bowl with celadon glaze and Fencai enamel, Qing dynasty, Qianlong period. National Palace Museum

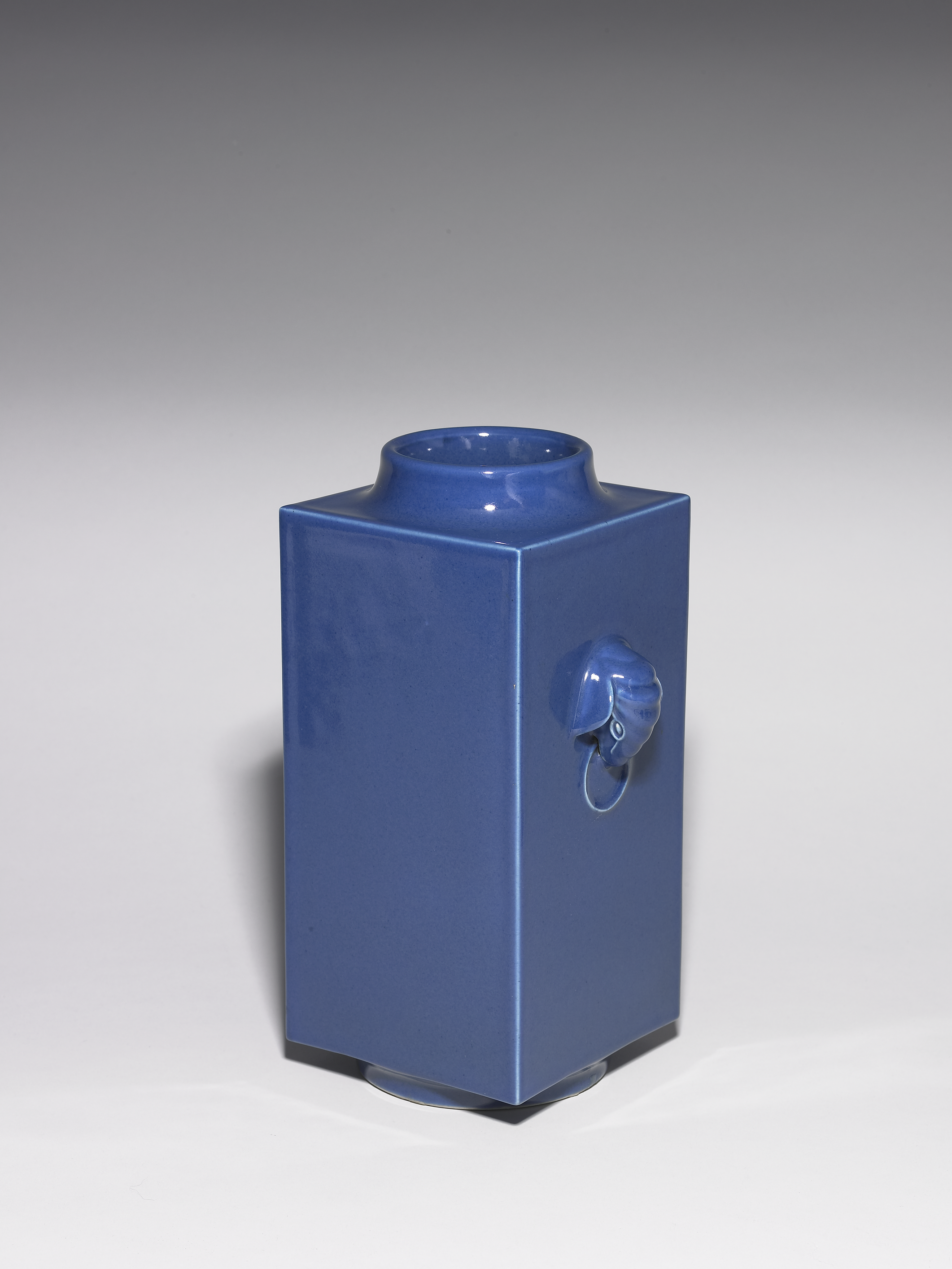
Cong-shaped vase (zong shi ping 琮式瓶) with cobalt blue glaze, Qing dynasty (before 1908). The form derives from the cong 琮, a jade ritual object of the Neolithic period later replicated in bronze during the Shang and Zhou dynasties. National Palace Museum

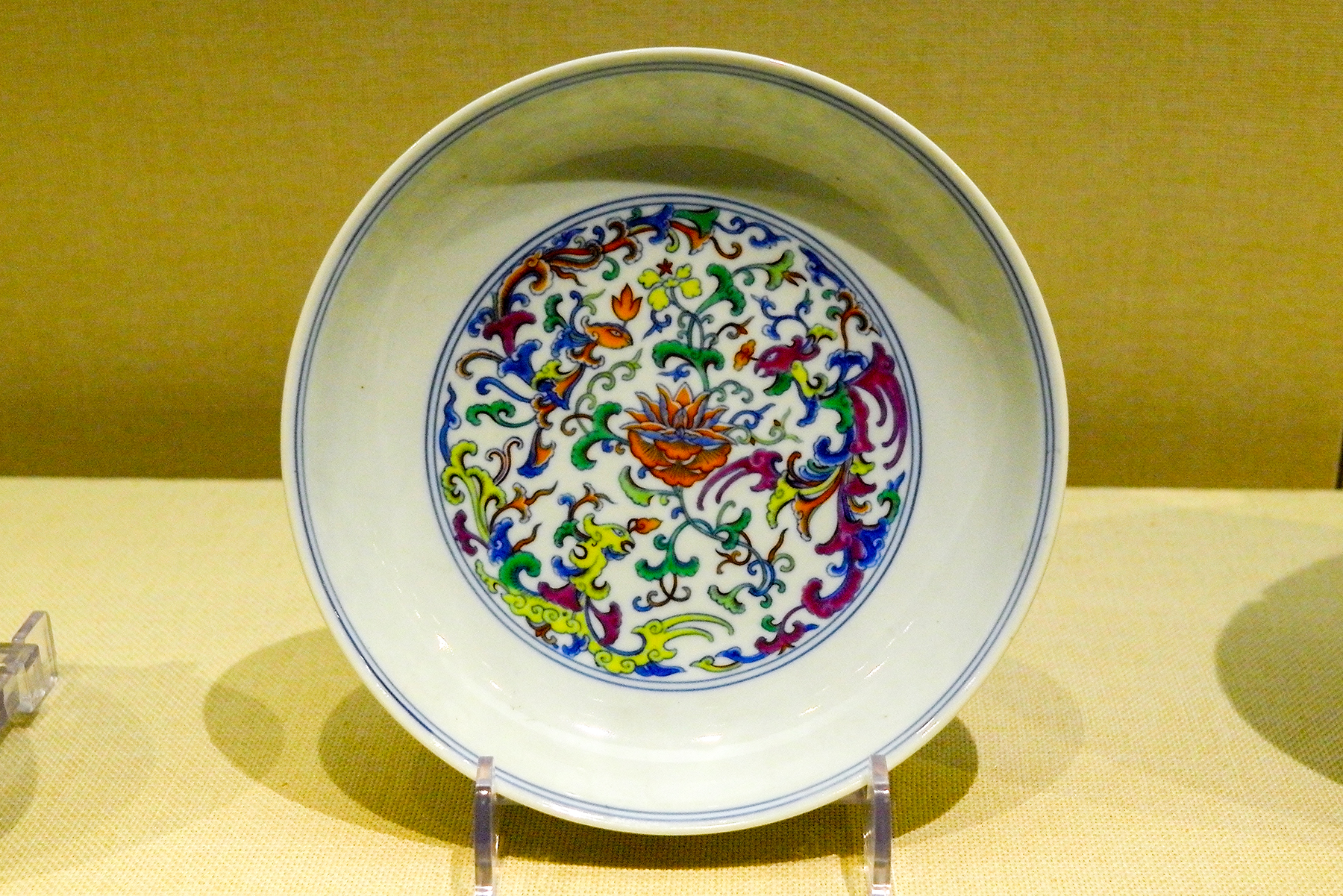
Doucai dish with floral and kui-phoenix design, Qing dynasty, Qianlong period. Nanjing Museum.

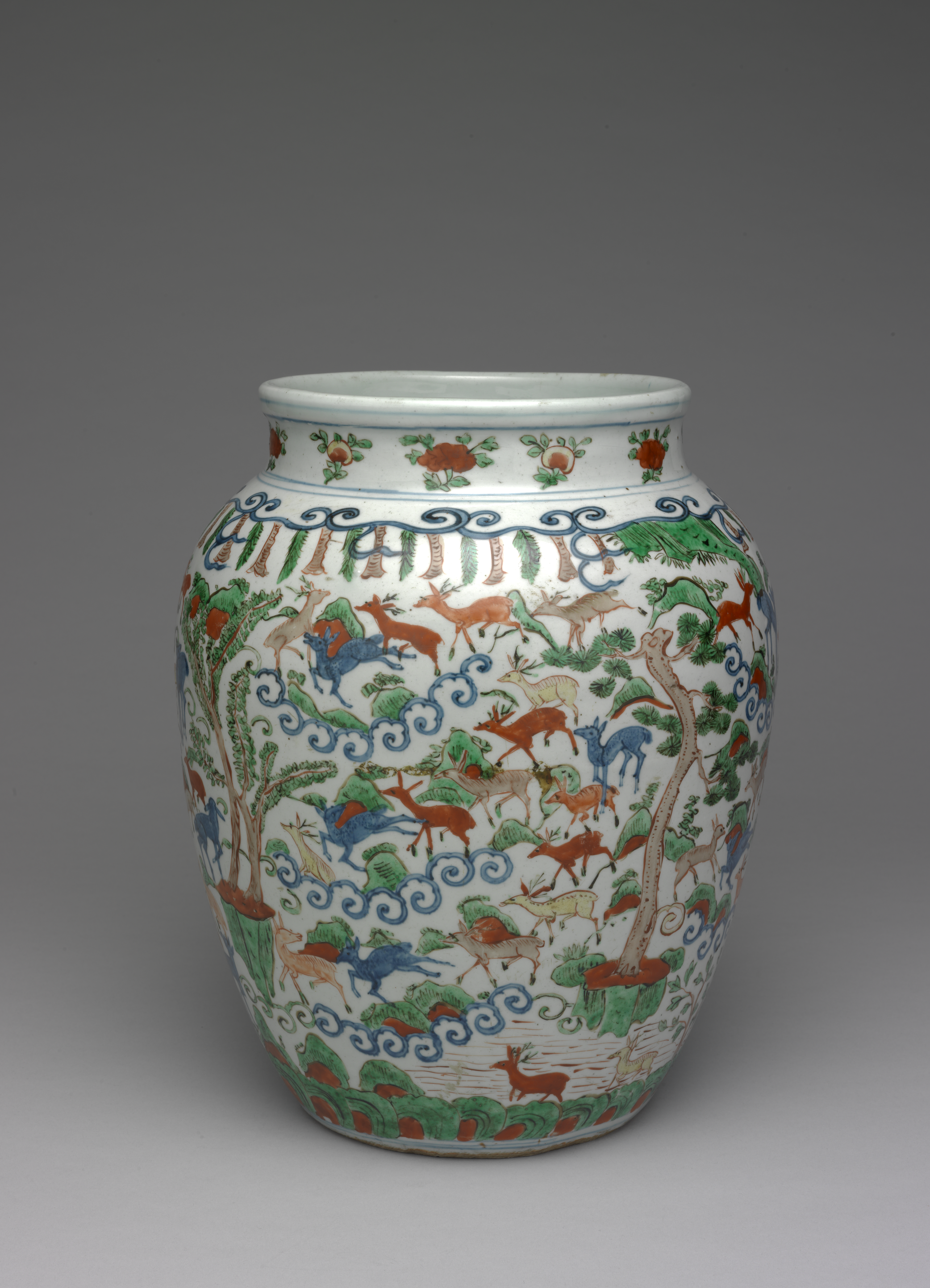
Wucai "Hundred Deer" vase (bai lu zun 百鹿尊), Ming dynasty, Wanli period (1573–1620). National Palace Museum

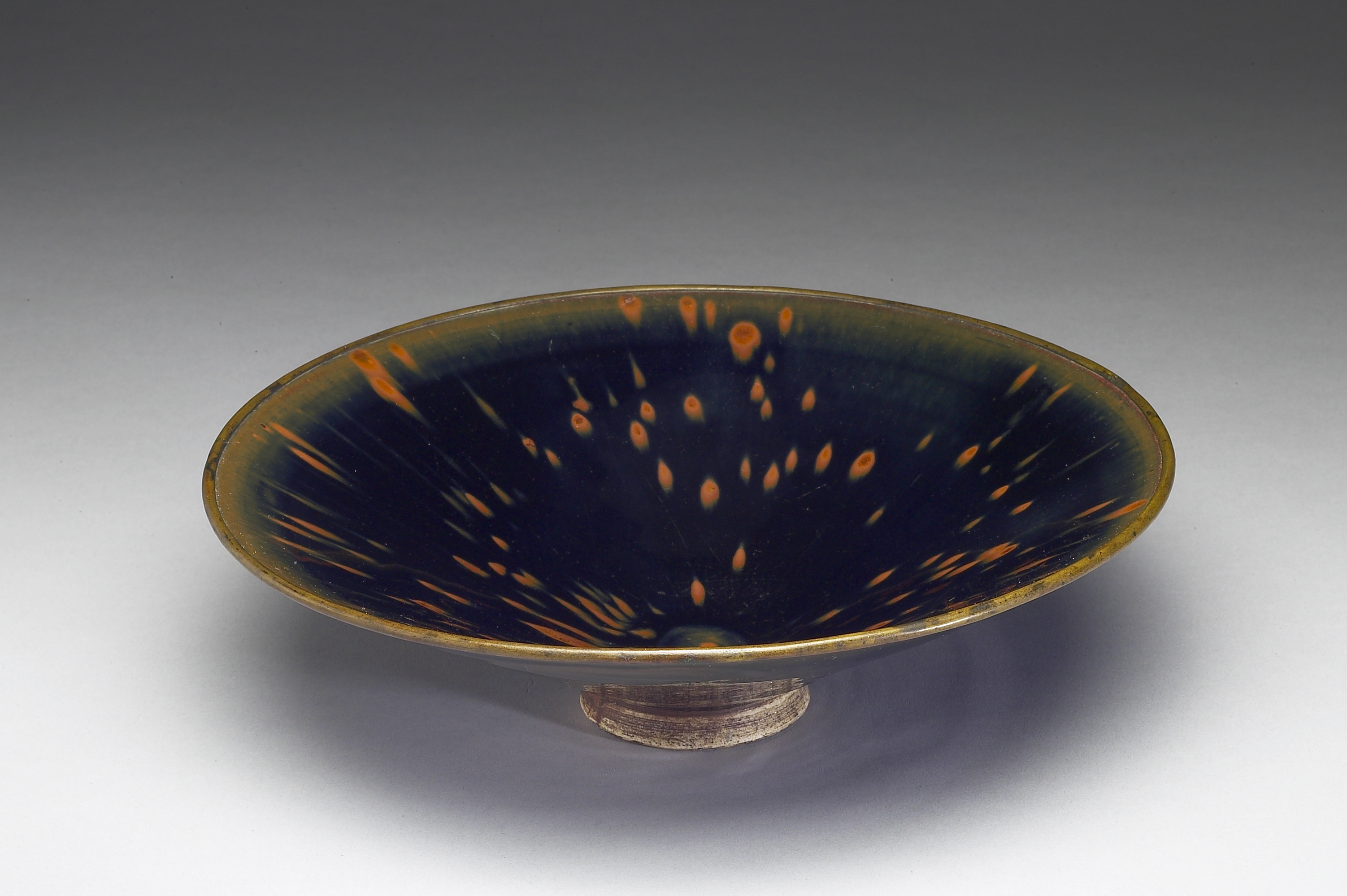
Black-glazed tea bowl with "partridge feather" splashes (zhegu ban 鷓鴣斑), Song dynasty (960–1279), Jizhou ware. National Palace Museum

Coupled vase with flower-and-bird panels in fencai rose enamels, one panel with magpies and plum blossoms and the other with quails and narcissi, Qing dynasty, Qianlong reign (1736–1795), height 20 cm. National Palace Museum

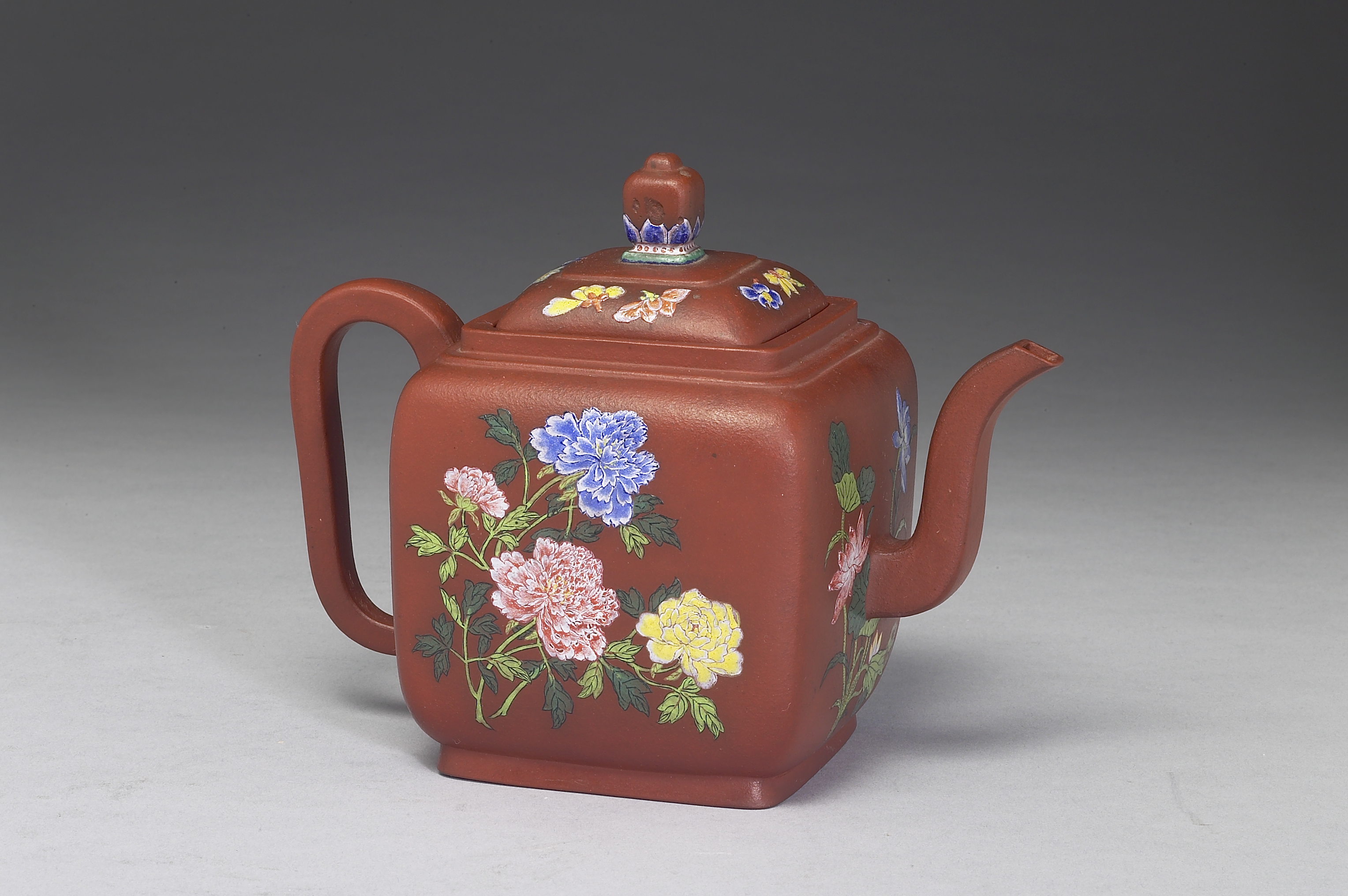
Yixing square teapot with flowers of the four seasons in painted enamels, Qing dynasty, Kangxi reign (1662–1722). National Palace Museum

Dish with “Mother Tutoring Her Child” motif in falangcai painted enamels, Qing dynasty, Qianlong reign (1736–1795). National Palace Museum

Six conjoined vases in tea-dust glaze, Qing dynasty, Qianlong reign (1736–1795). National Palace Museum

Seated Guanyin, Dehua porcelain with ivory-white glaze, bearing two seals of the potter Chen Wei, Ming dynasty, 17th century, height 19.7 cm. Virginia Museum of Fine Arts

Daoist divine official by Qiao Bin, Shanxi liuli glazed stoneware, Ming dynasty, dated 1482. Metropolitan Museum of Art

Red-glazed bowl with a pair of five-clawed dragons impressed under the glaze on the inner wall, Ming dynasty, Hongwu reign (1368–1398), diameter 9.5 cm. National Palace Museum

Plate painted in yellow and green su sancai with flowers and fruits, with a six-character Kangxi reign mark in underglaze blue on the base, Qing dynasty, Kangxi reign (1662–1722), diameter 24.7 cm. National Palace Museum

Yixing stoneware guqin in tea-dust glaze, named Xiushen lixing, Qing dynasty, Qianlong reign (1736–1795). National Palace Museum

Small blue-and-white covered wine pot or teapot, Qing dynasty, Kangxi reign (1662–1722). Metropolitan Museum of Art

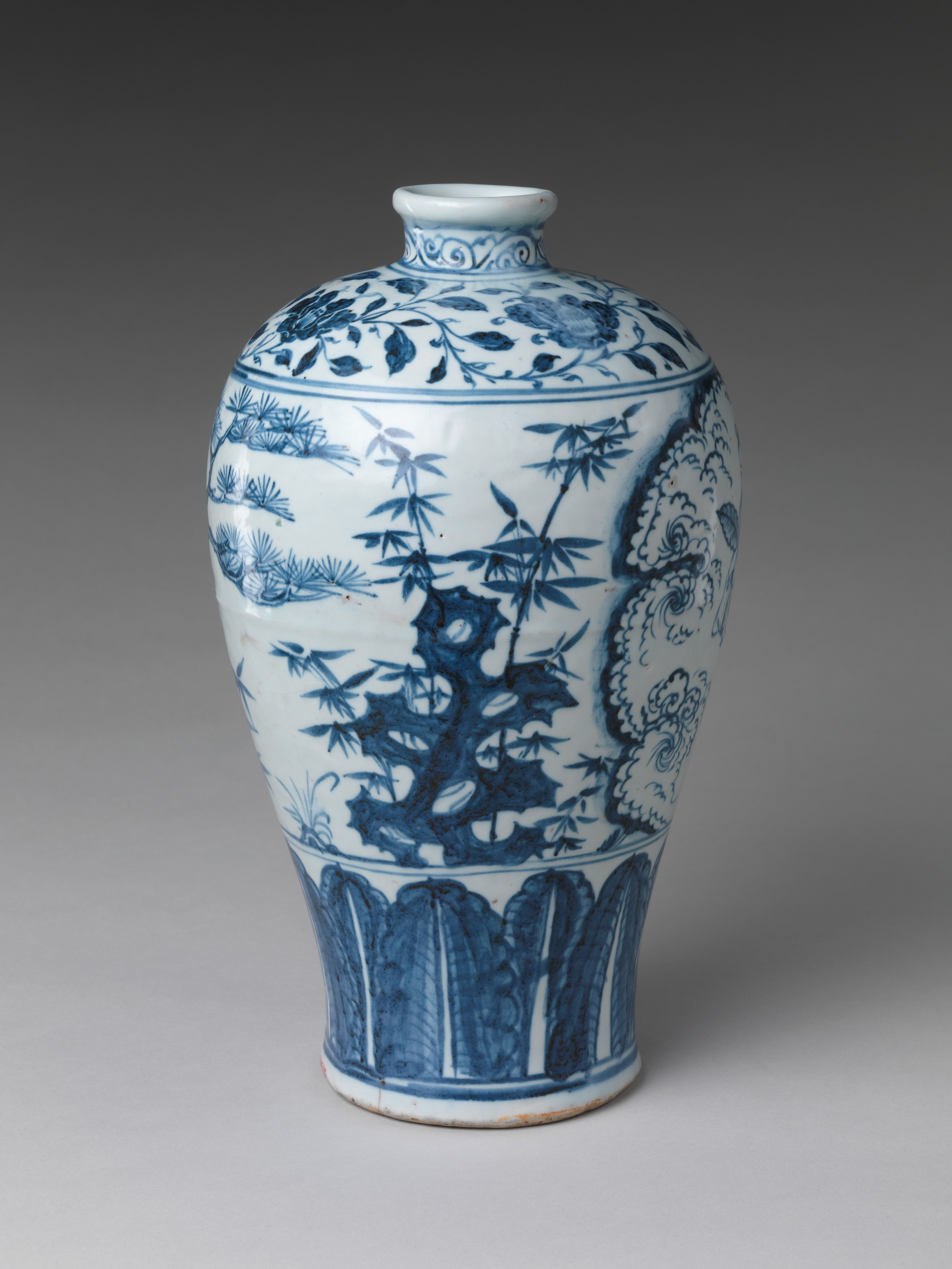
Blue-and-white meiping vase with the Daoist immortal Zhongli Quan, Jingdezhen ware, Ming dynasty, second half of the 15th century. Metropolitan Museum of Art

== Furniture ==
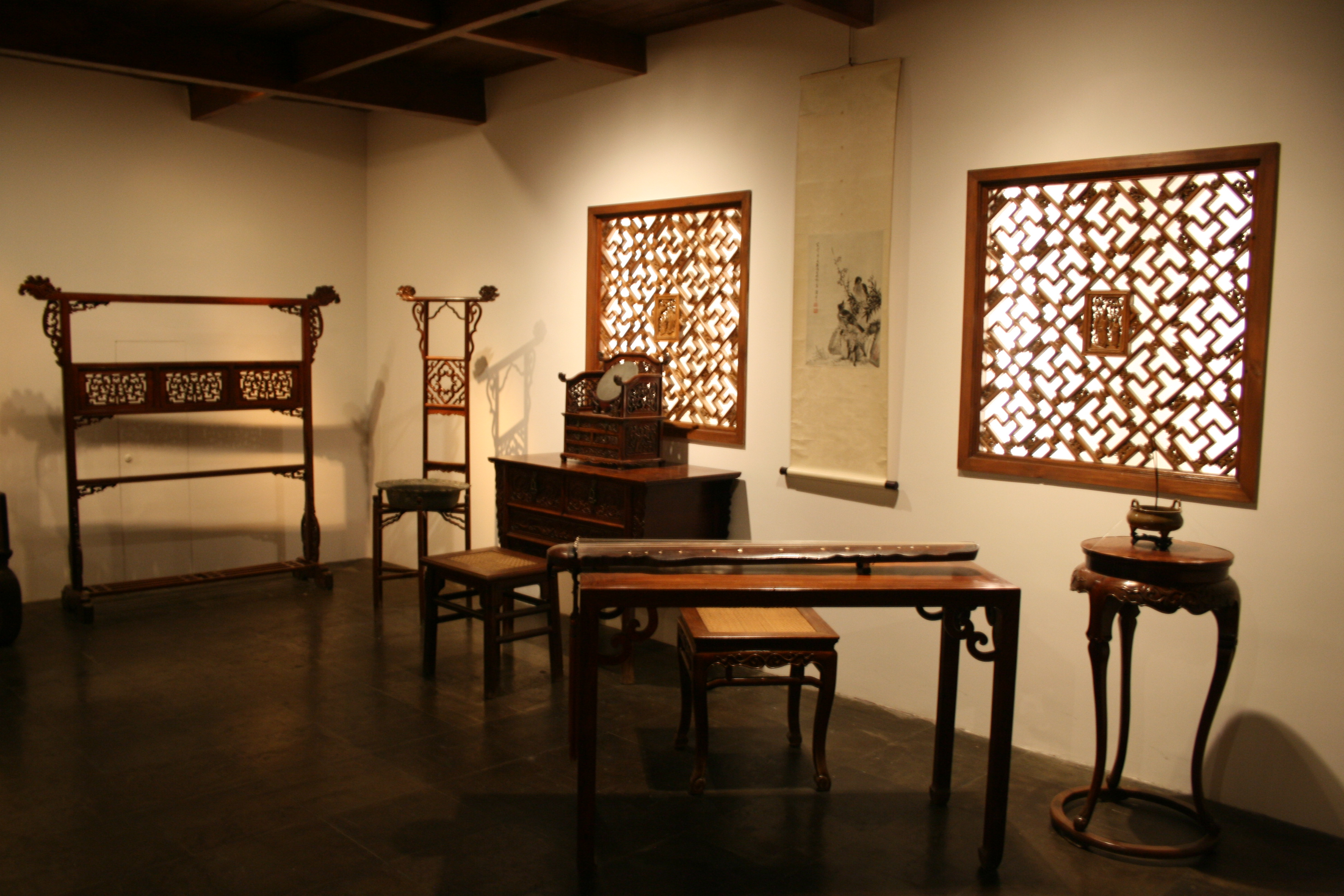
Ming-style antique furniture displayed as a room setting in the Shanghai Museum. From left: a clothes rack, a washbasin stand, a cabinet-chest with a mirror stand on top, two stools, a narrow table holding a guqin, and a round incense stand with a bronze censer

Chinese furniture of the Ming (1368–1644) and Qing (1644–1912) dynasties is regarded as one of the highest achievements in furniture design and craftsmanship. Ming furniture is characterized by elegant proportions, minimal ornamentation, and sophisticated joinery techniques that require no nails or glue. Its aesthetic principles, emphasizing negative space, structural honesty, and the natural beauty of materials, have influenced modern designers, including Danish furniture maker Hans Wegner. Qing furniture retained the basic forms and joinery of the Ming but became far more richly decorated, with relief and openwork carving, inlays of mother-of-pearl, jade, enamel and stone, and carved lacquer. The modern systematic study of classical Chinese furniture began with scholar Wang Shixiang (王世襄, 1914–2009), whose Classic Chinese Furniture: Ming and Early Qing Dynasties (1985) established the field.

The most prized materials are huanghuali (黃花梨, a type of rosewood) and zitan (紫檀, padauk), both dense hardwoods with distinctive grain patterns, Hongmu (紅木, blackwood) was also widely used for fine furniture, particularly in the Qing dynasty. These woods were scarce even during the Ming dynasty and are now extremely rare. The refined aesthetics of Ming furniture—clean lines, subtle curves, and respect for natural wood grain—reflect the tastes of the scholar-official class and literati culture.

Construction relies on complex mortise-and-tenon joinery (榫卯結構), with dozens of distinct joint types developed over centuries. This interlocking system allows furniture to expand and contract with humidity changes while maintaining structural integrity for hundreds of years.

Qing dynasty furniture (1644–1912) shifted toward heavier proportions, more elaborate carving, and the use of lacquer and inlay decoration, reflecting Manchu court tastes and increased contact with European design.

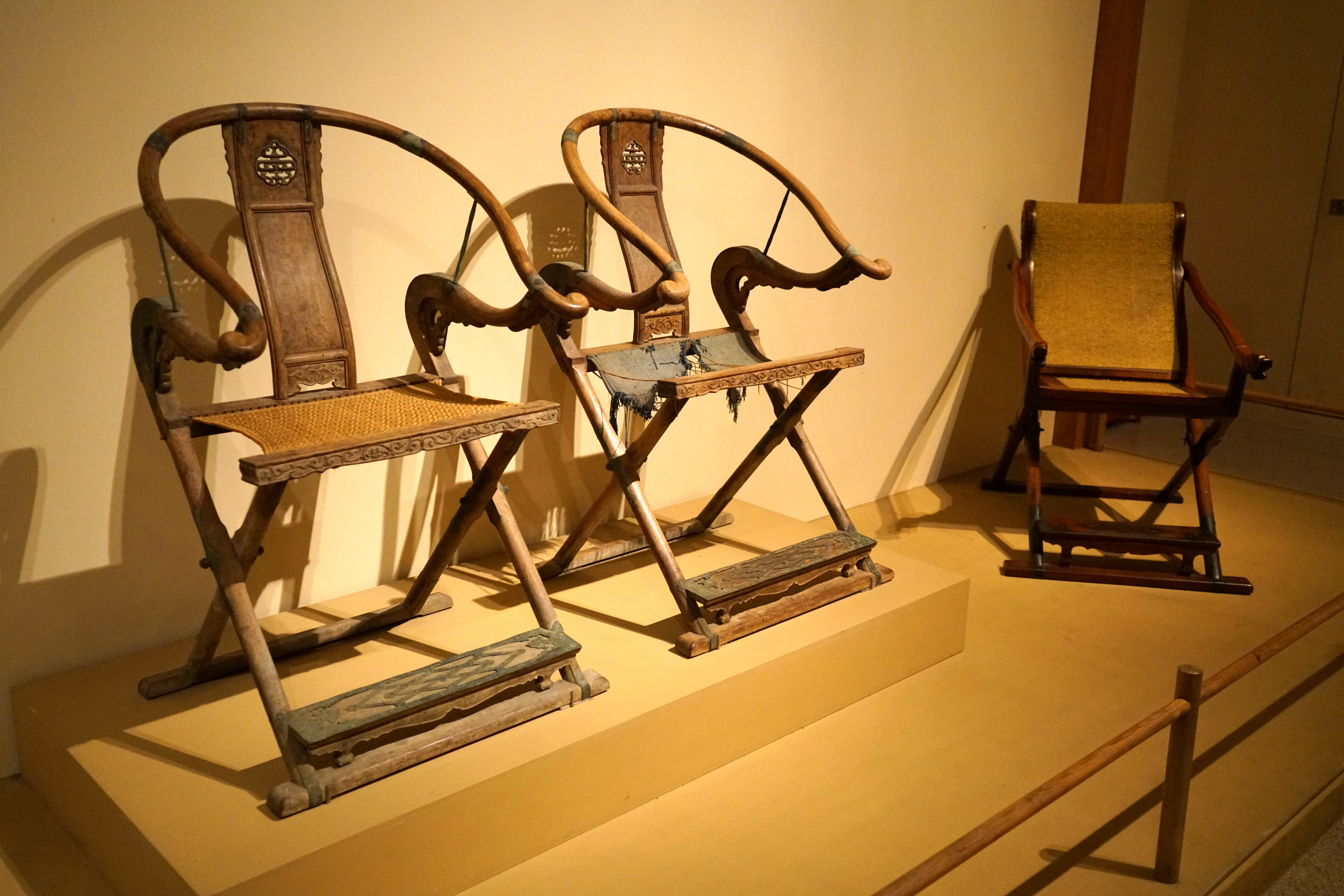
Huanghuali folding horseshoe-back armchair (jiaoyi) with carved floral splat, Ming dynasty, 16th–17th century. Nelson-Atkins Museum of Art

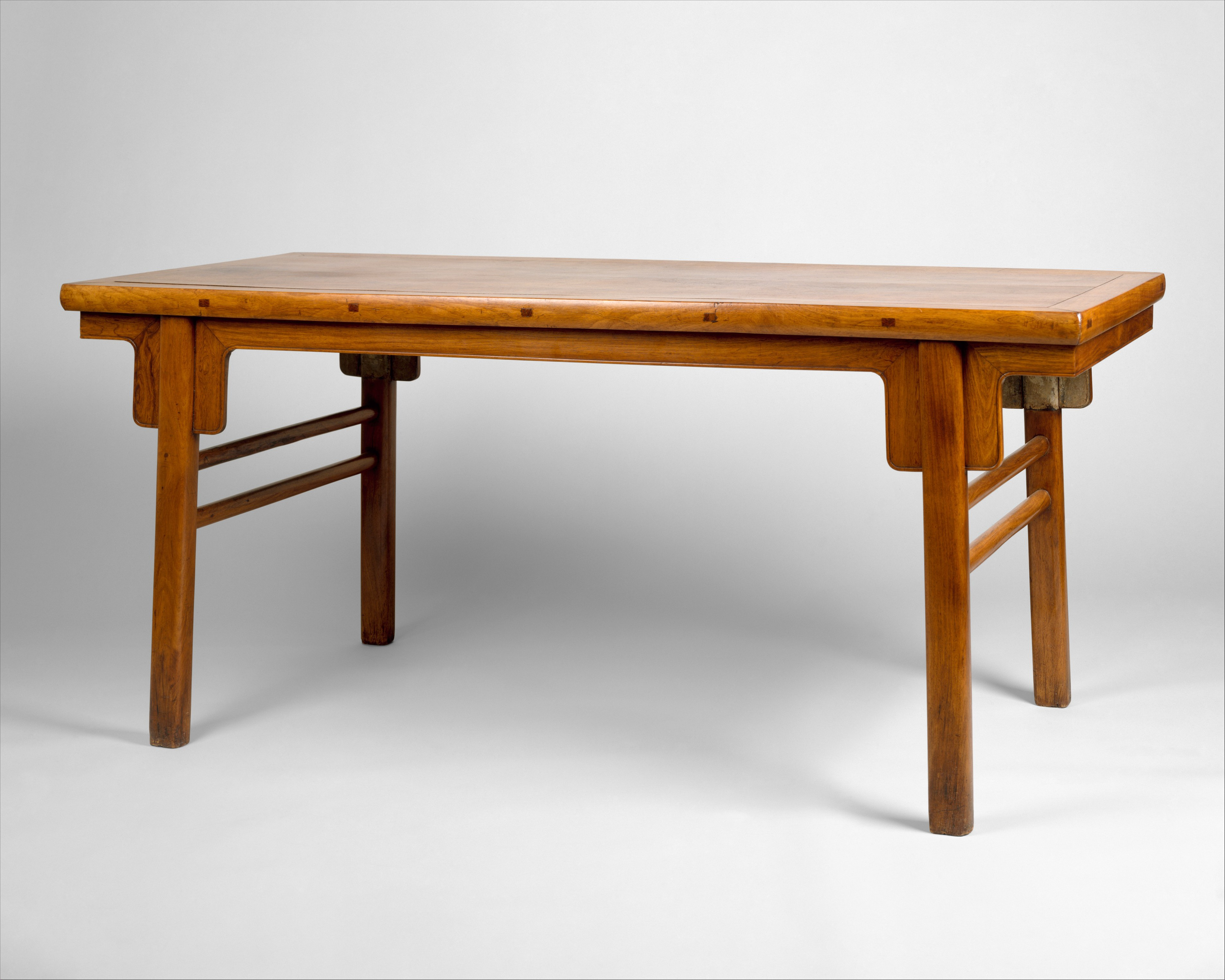
Huanghuali painting table, Ming dynasty, late 16th–early 17th century. Metropolitan Museum of Art, New York

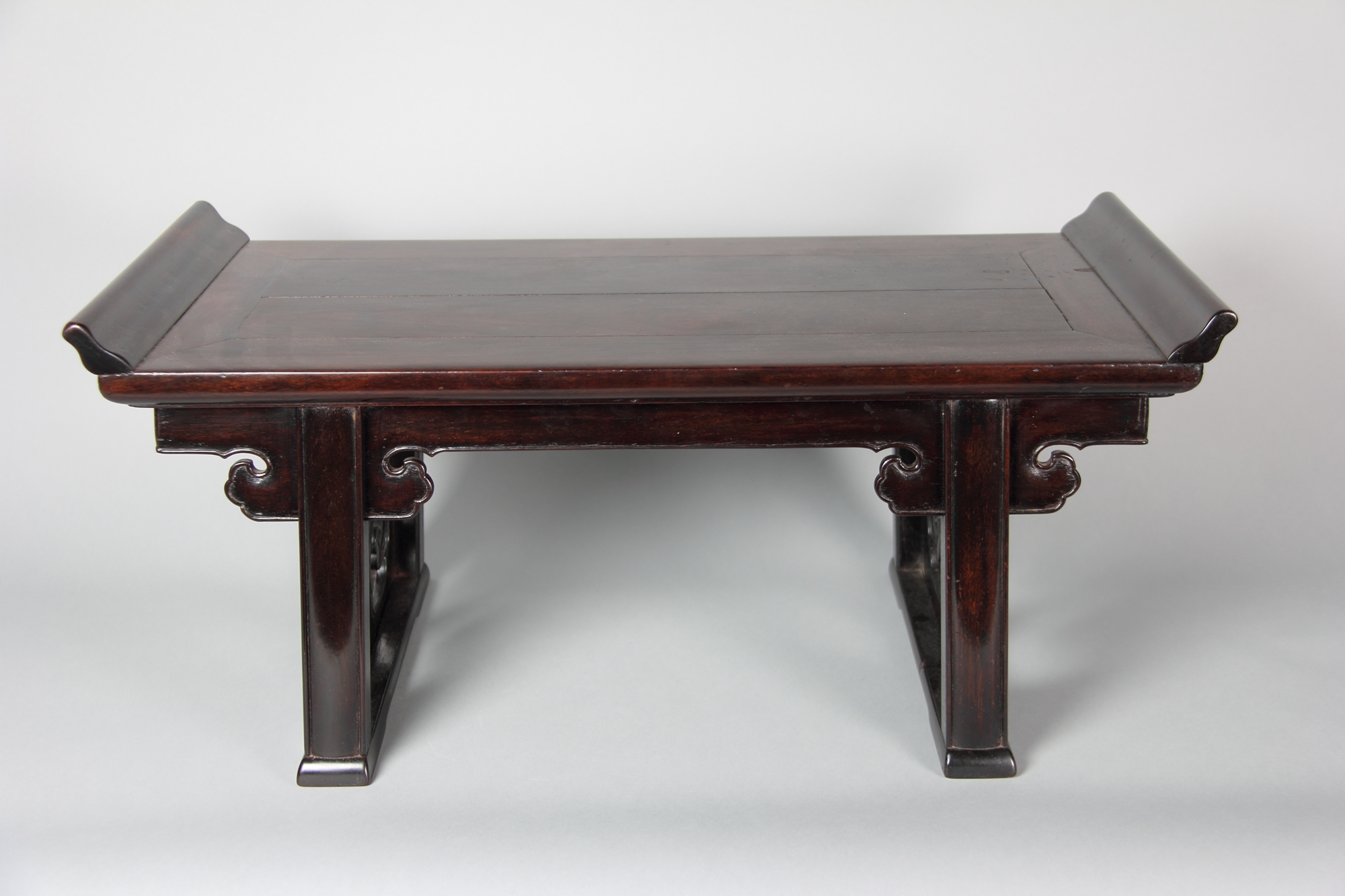
Zitan table stand (front), Qing dynasty, 17th–18th century. Metropolitan Museum of Art

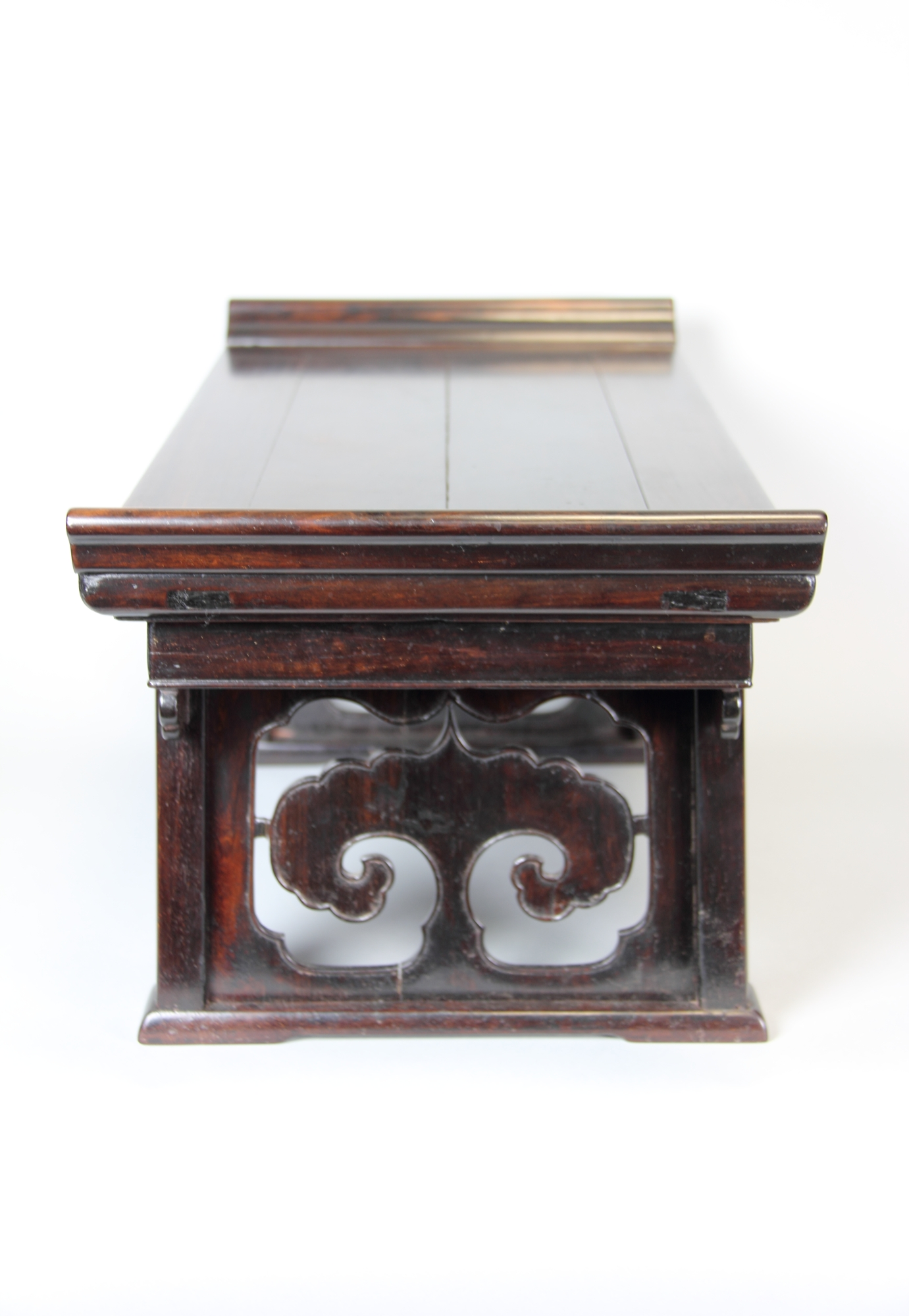
Zitan table stand (side), Qing dynasty, 17th–18th century. Metropolitan Museum of Art

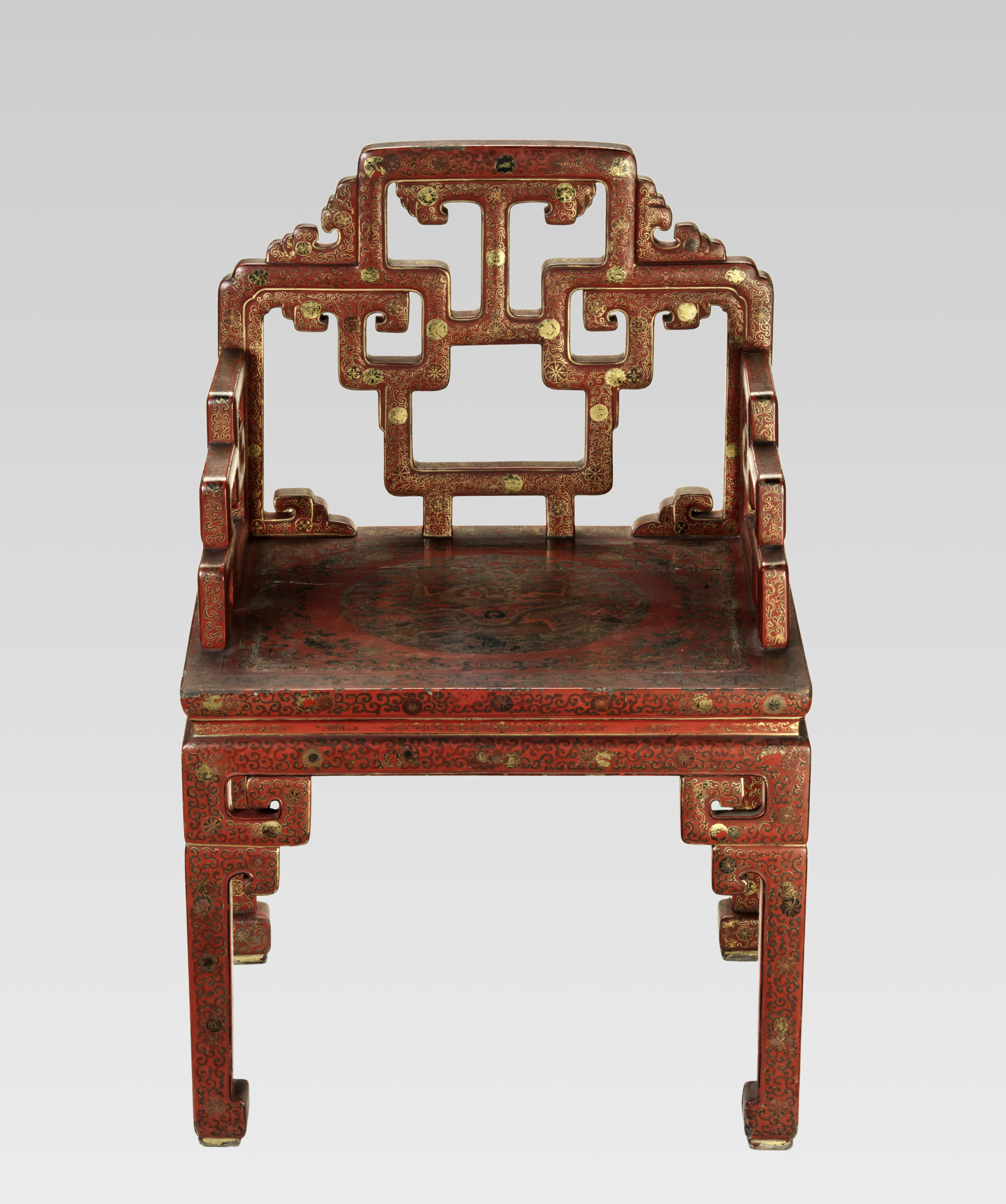
Red lacquer armchair with painted gold and black motifs, Qing dynasty, 18th–19th century

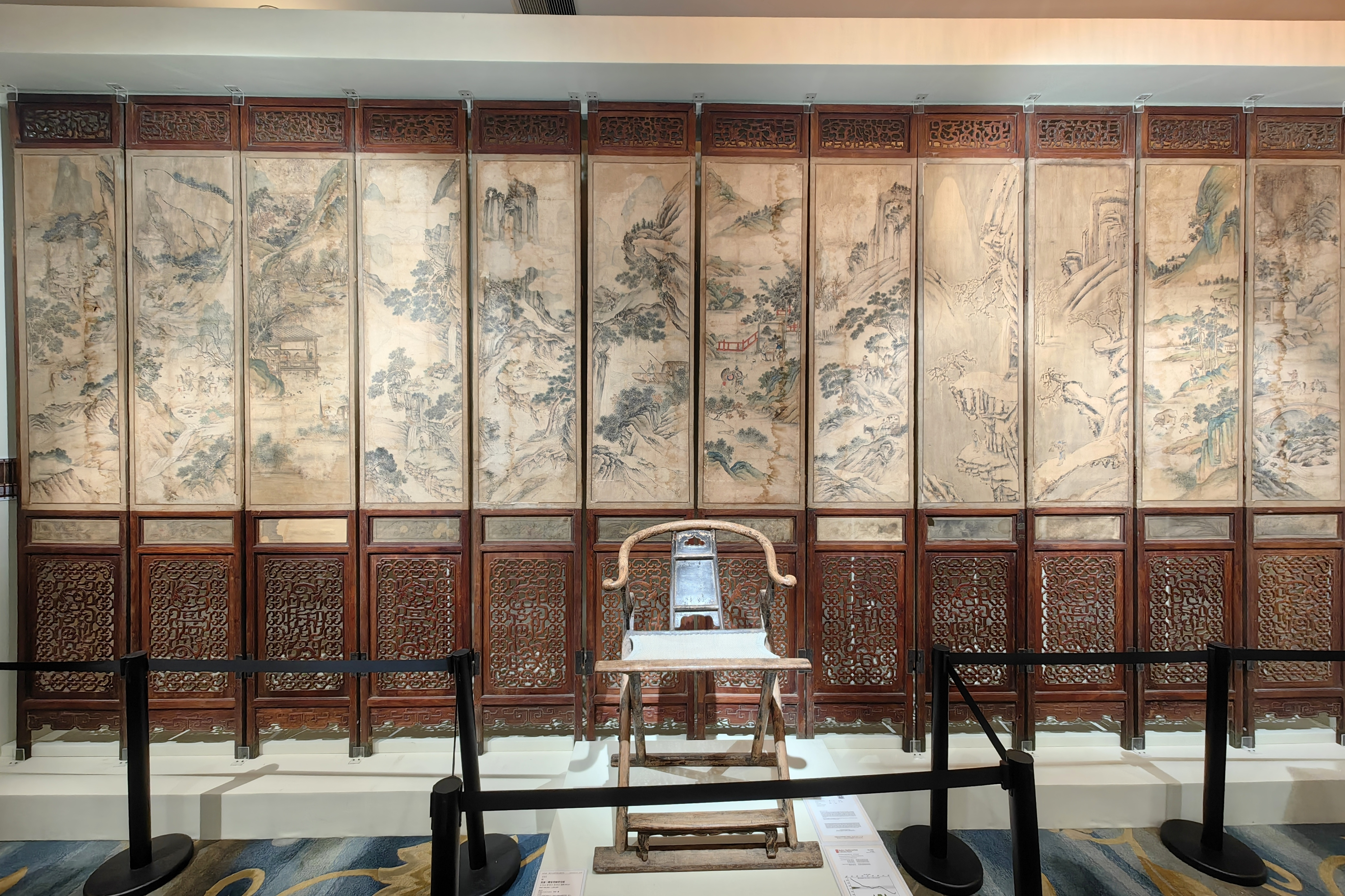
Huanghuali twelve-panel folding screen with chilong, bat, and figural narrative scenes, Ming–Qing dynasty, 17th century

Daybed (ta), Ming dynasty, 16th–17th century. Shanghai Museum

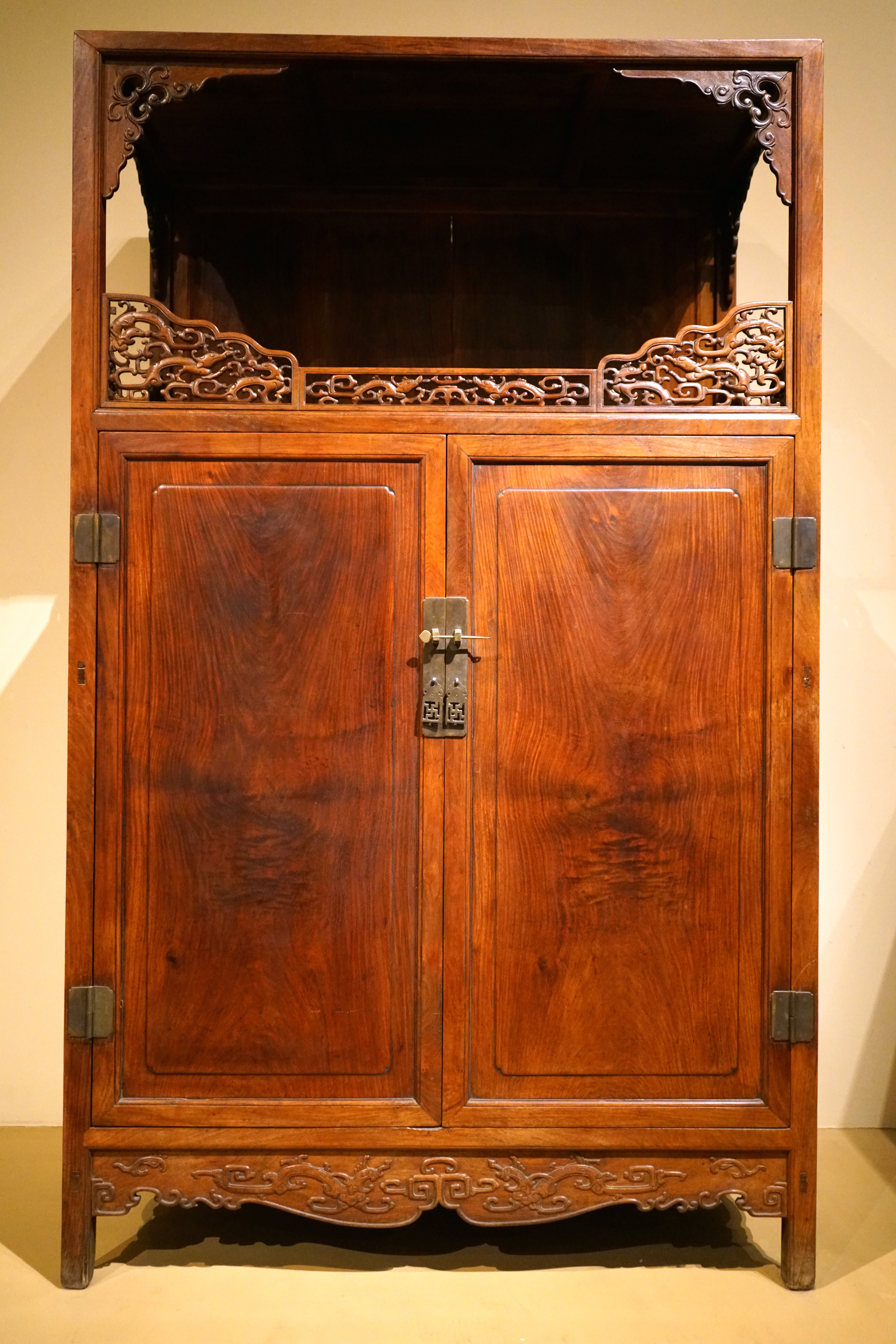
Huanghuali display cabinet (lianggegui) with openwork dragon (chilong) apron, Ming dynasty, 17th century

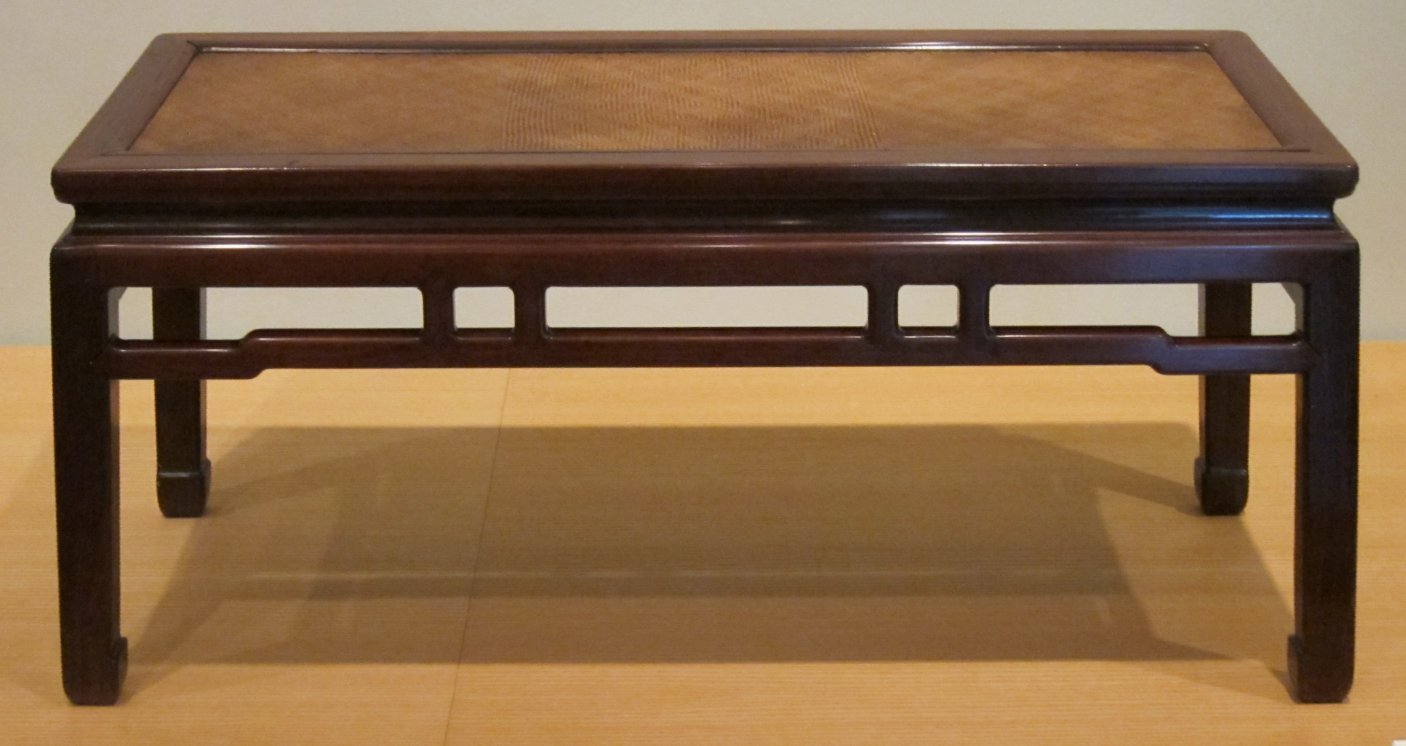
Hongmu bench (bandeng), Qing dynasty, late 17th century. Honolulu Museum of Art

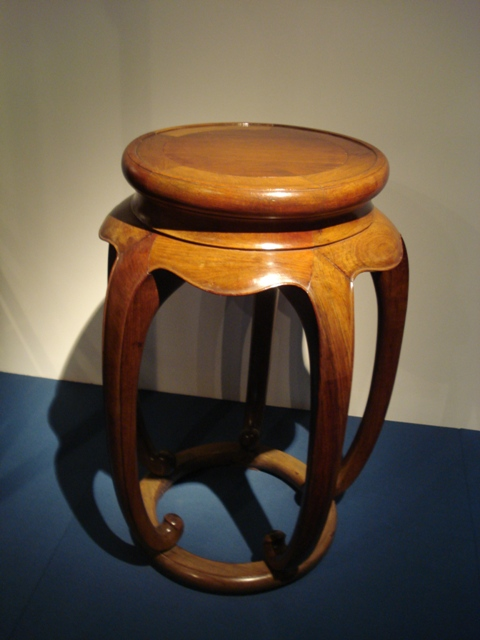
Huanghuali circular incense stand (xiangji) with five cabriole legs, Ming dynasty. Shanghai Museum

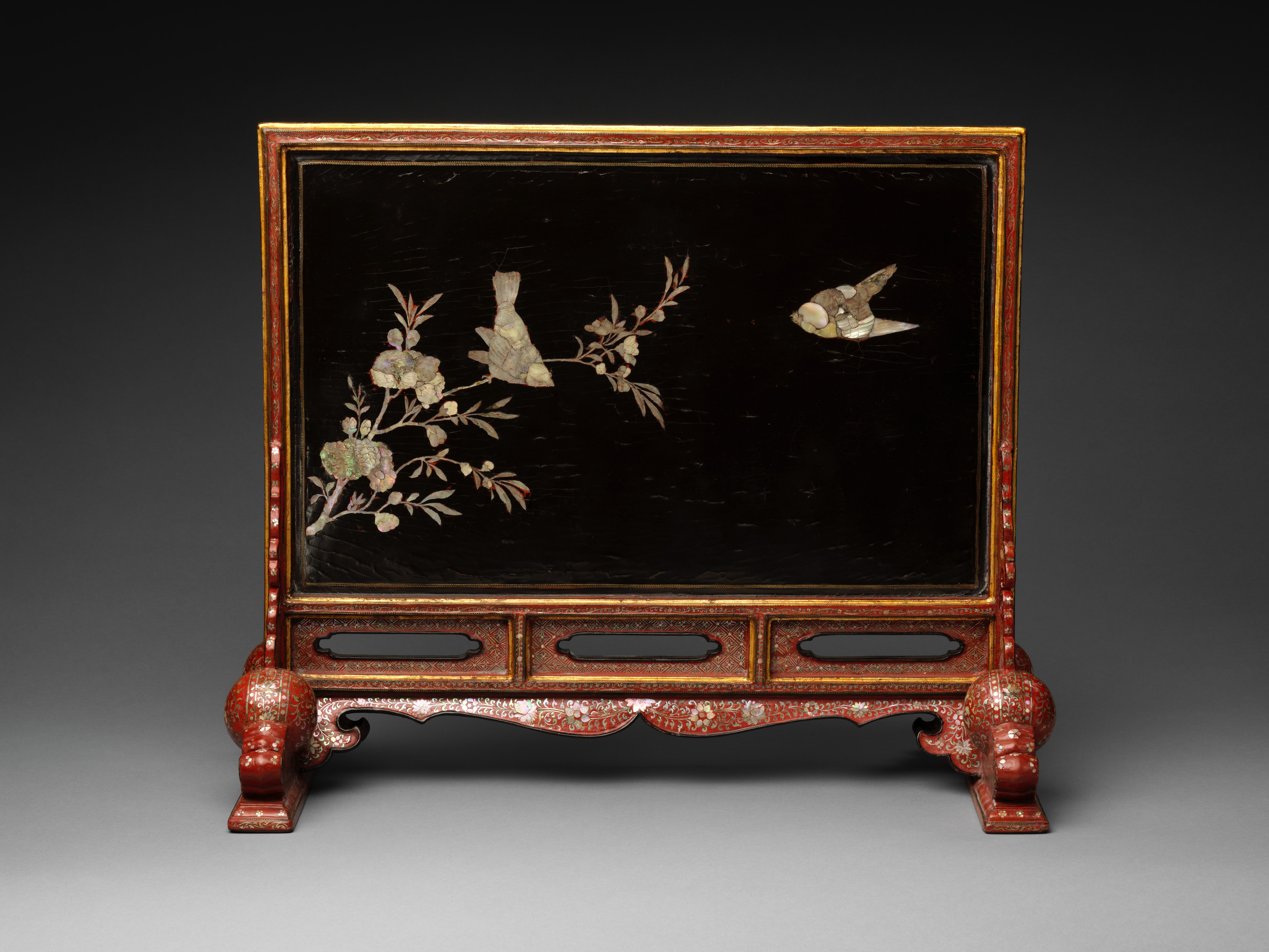
Table screen with flowers and birds, lacquer inlaid with mother-of-pearl, late Ming dynasty (late 16th–early 17th century), Metropolitan Museum of Art

Marble table screen inscribed and signed by Ruan Yuan, later converted to a wall panel, Qing dynasty (19th century), Metropolitan Museum of Art

Wardrobe with baibaoqian (百宝嵌, “hundred-treasure inlay”) decoration of mother-of-pearl, amber, glass, ivory and other materials, Ming dynasty (late 16th or early 17th century), Metropolitan Museum of Art

Pair of porcelain table screen plaques painted in overglaze enamels with scholar’s furniture, Jingdezhen, Qing dynasty, Qianlong reign (1736–1795), Musée Guimet, Paris

Painted enamel throne table (kang table) with lotus and bats on an imperial yellow ground, gilt copper, Guangzhou, Qing dynasty, Qianlong seal mark and period (1736–1795), Khalili Collection of Enamels of the World

== Decorative arts ==
As well as porcelain, a wide range of materials that were more valuable were worked and decorated with great skill for a range of uses or just for display. Chinese jade was attributed with magical powers, and was used in the Stone and Bronze Ages for large and impractical versions of everyday weapons and tools, as well as the bi disks and cong vessels. Later a range of objects and small sculptures were carved in jade, a difficult and time-consuming technique. Bronze, gold and silver, rhinoceros horn, Chinese silk, ivory, lacquer and carved lacquer, cloisonne enamel and many other materials had specialist artists working in them. Cloisonne underwent an interesting process of artistic hybridization in China, particularly in the pieces promoted by missionaries and Chinese Christian communities.

Folding screens (Chinese: 屏風; pinyin: píngfēng) are often decorated with beautiful art; major themes include mythology, scenes of palace life, and nature. Materials such as wood panel, paper and silk are used in making folding screens. They were considered ideal ornaments for many painters to display their paintings and calligraphy. Many artists painted on paper or silk and applied it onto the folding screen. There were two distinct artistic folding screens mentioned in historical literature of the era.

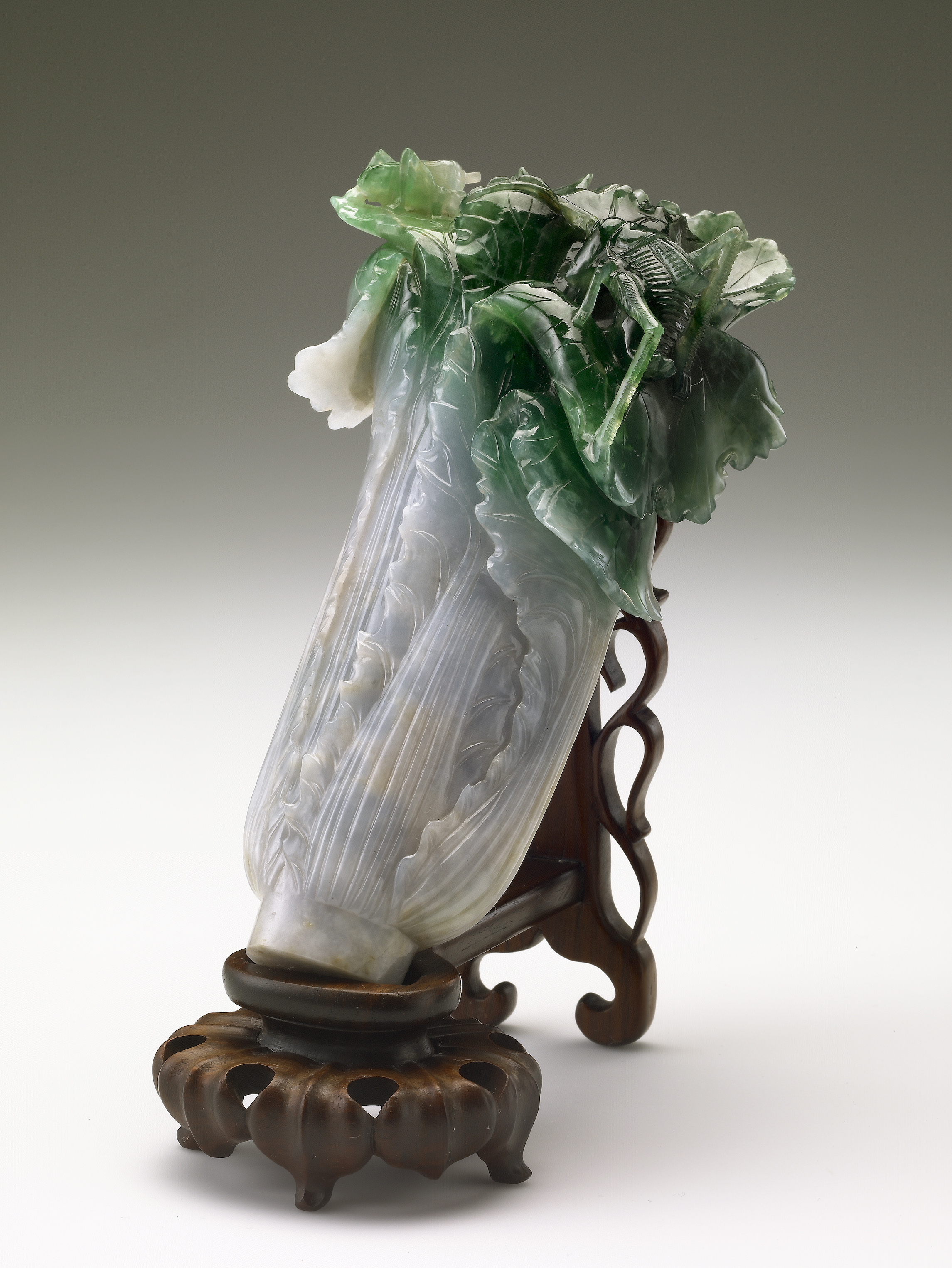
Jadeite Cabbage with Insects (翠玉白菜), Qing dynasty, 19th century. Carved from a single piece of jadeite, with a katydid and locust on the leaves. National Palace Museum

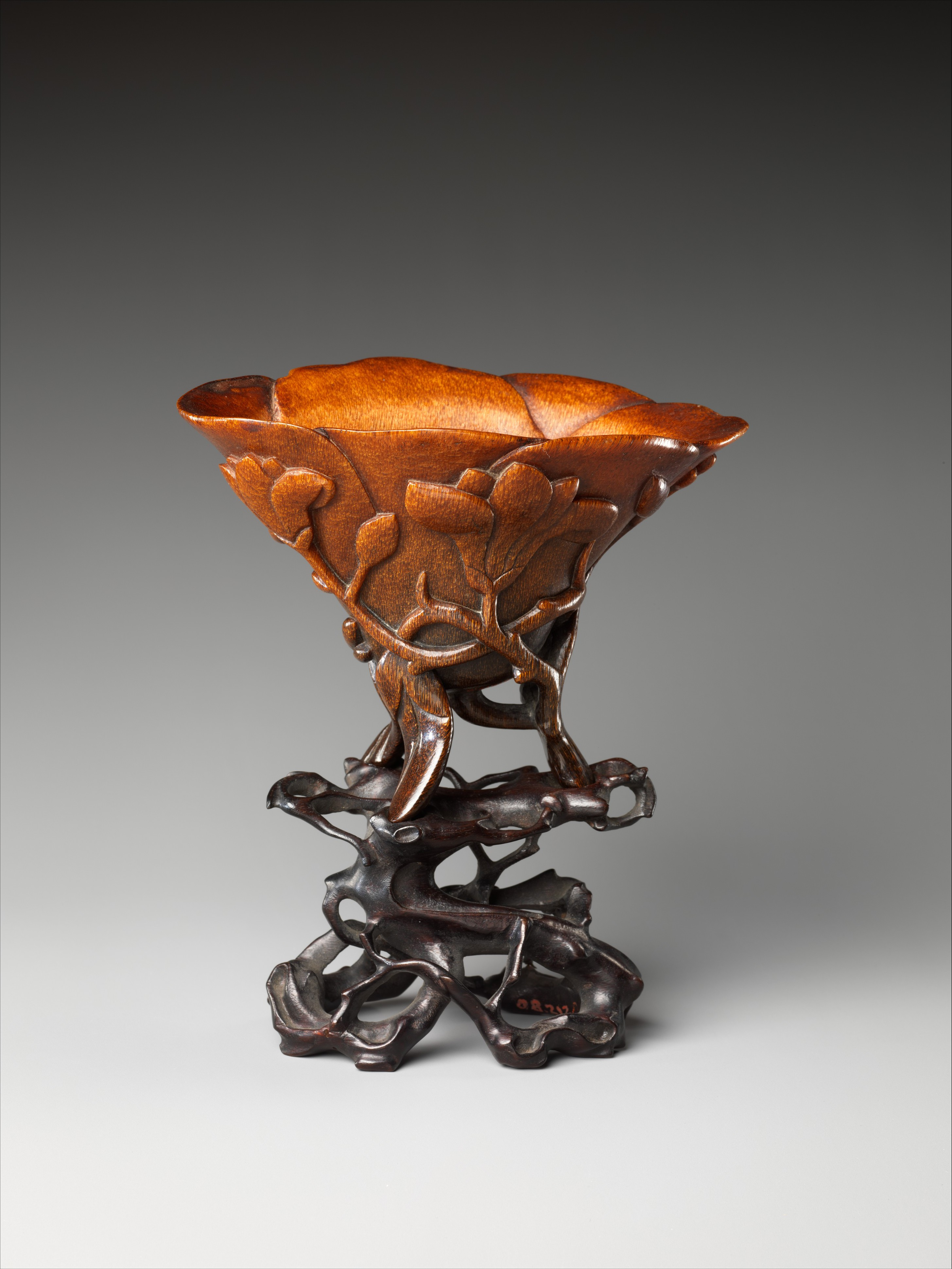
Cup; early 17th century; rhinoceros horn; height: 10.2 cm; Metropolitan Museum of Art

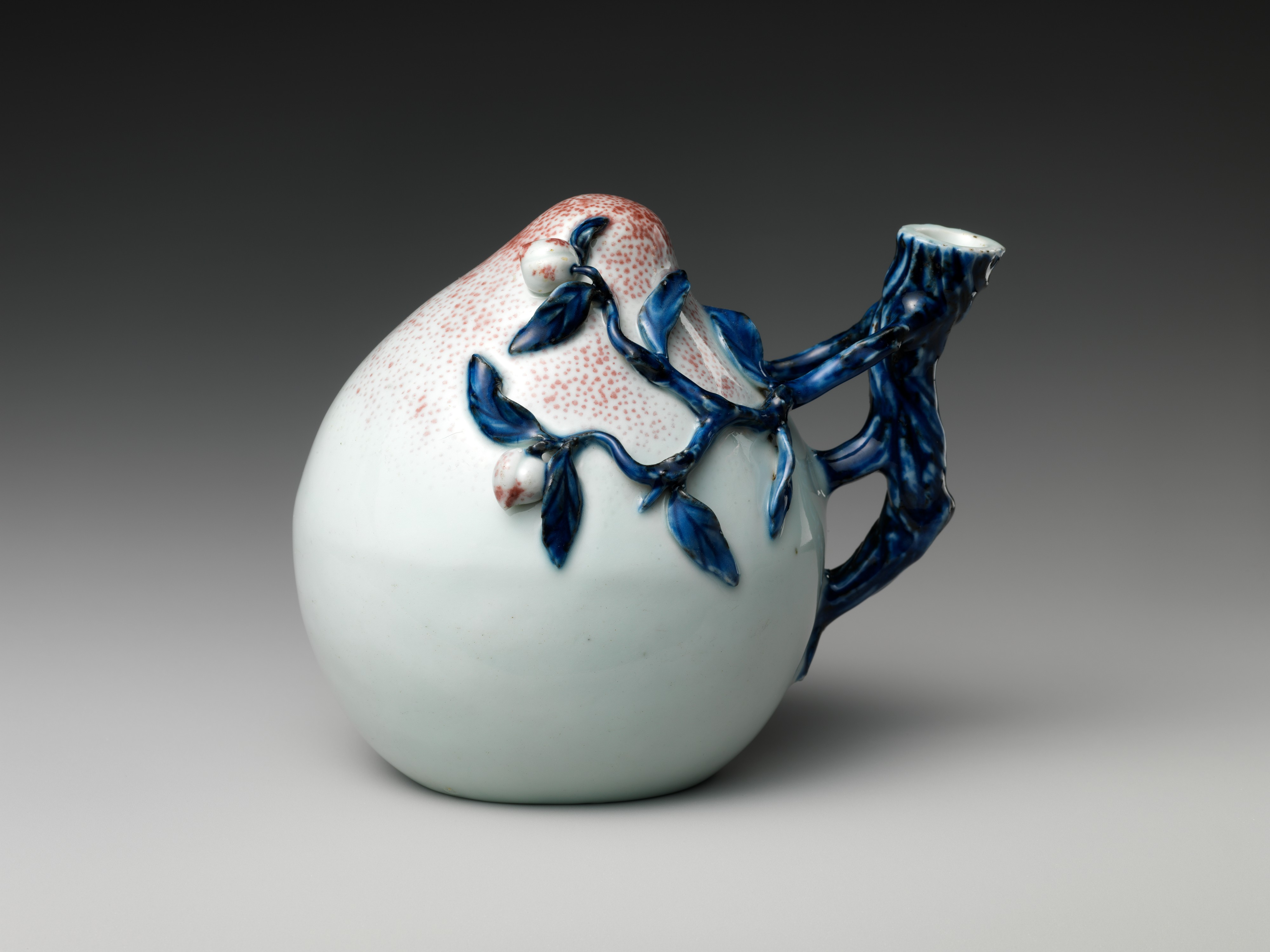
Container with colored enamel decoration over transparent glaze, Jingdezhen ware, 19th century, Metropolitan Museum of Art.

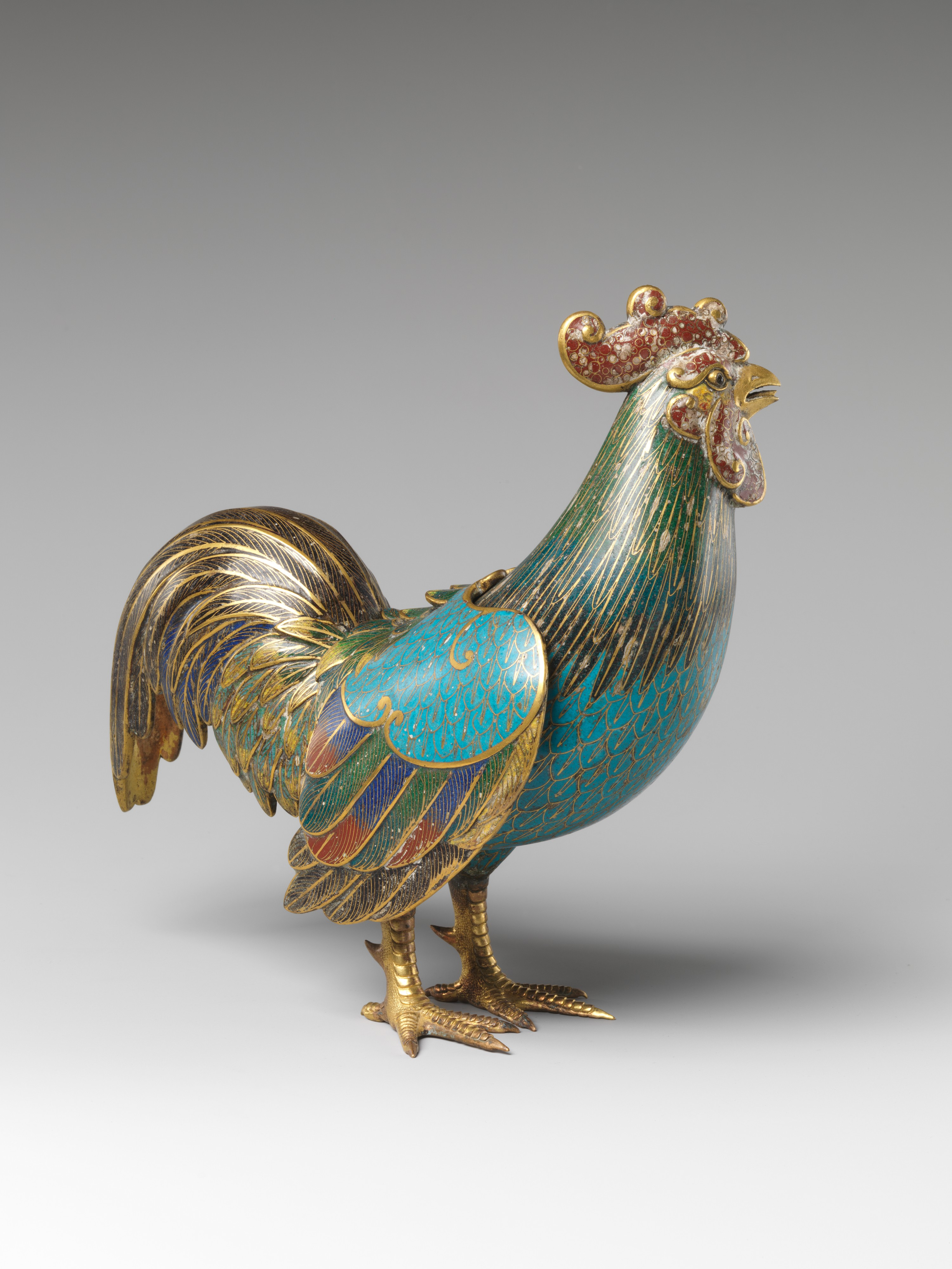
Incense burner in the shape of a rooster; 18th century; cloisonné enamel on copper; Metropolitan Museum of Art

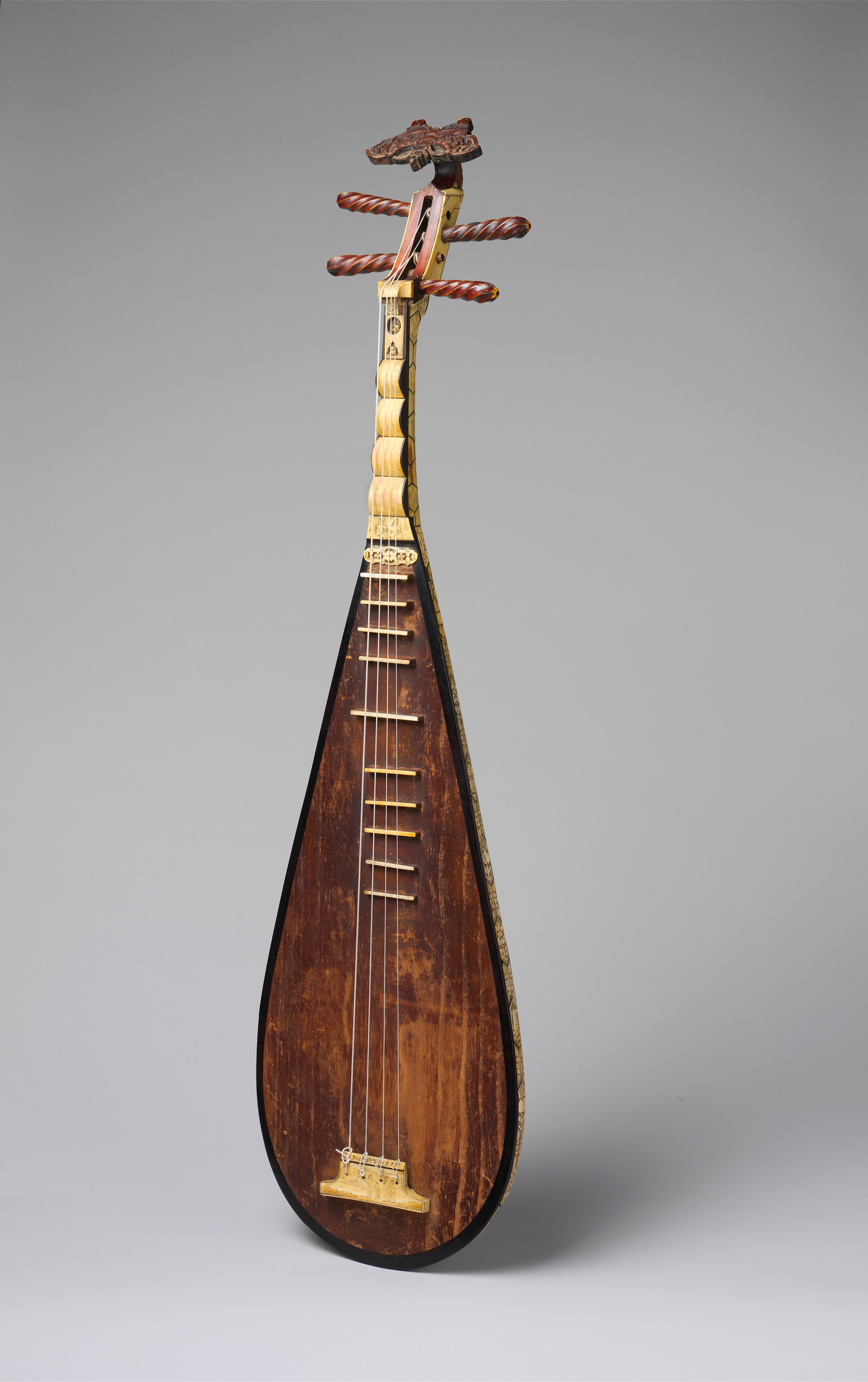
Pipa with carved and inlaid decoration, Qing dynasty. Metropolitan Museum of Art

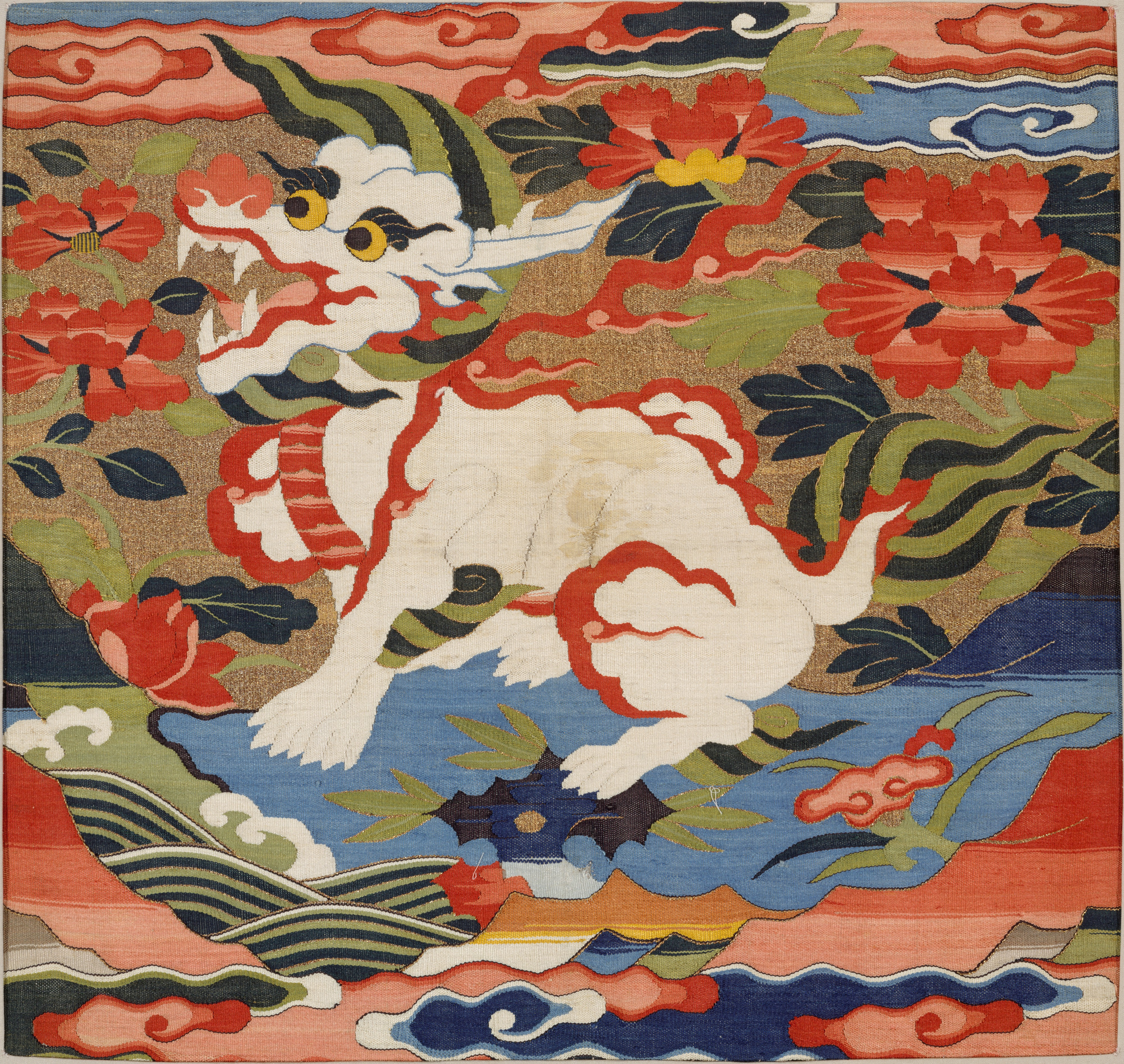
Rank badge (buzi) with mythical beast, silk embroidery, Ming dynasty (1368–1644). Metropolitan Museum of Art

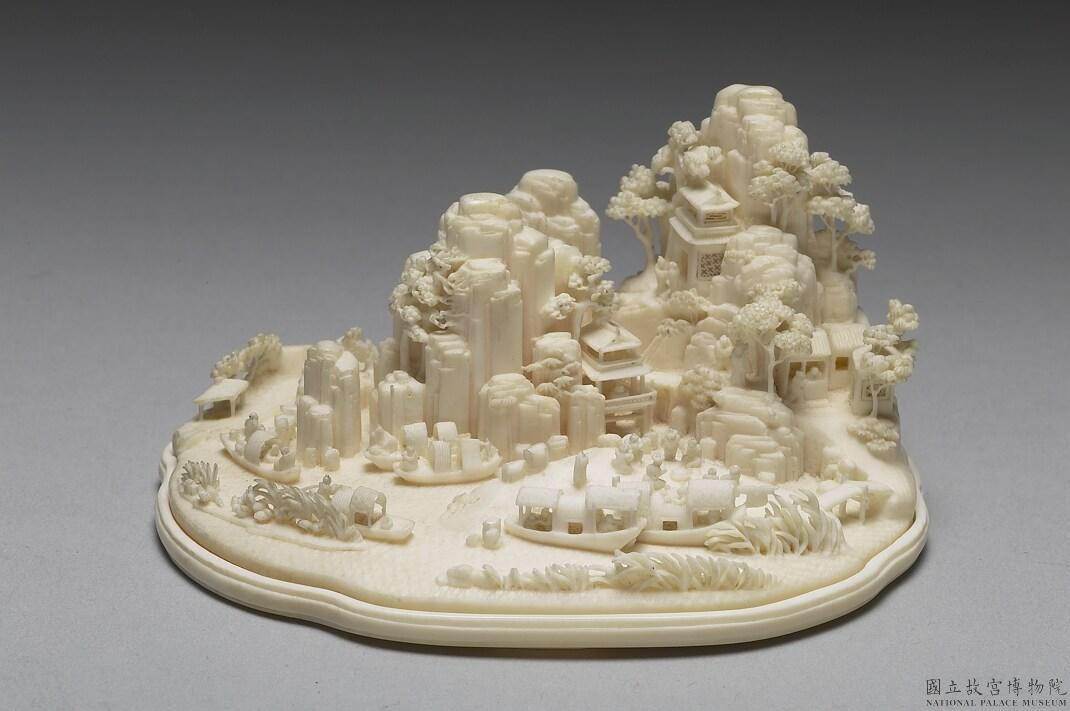
Miniature landscape with figures, Qing dynasty, 18th–19th century. Carved from a single piece of ivory depicting mountains, pavilions, bridges, streams, nine boats, and thirty-four figures. National Palace Museum

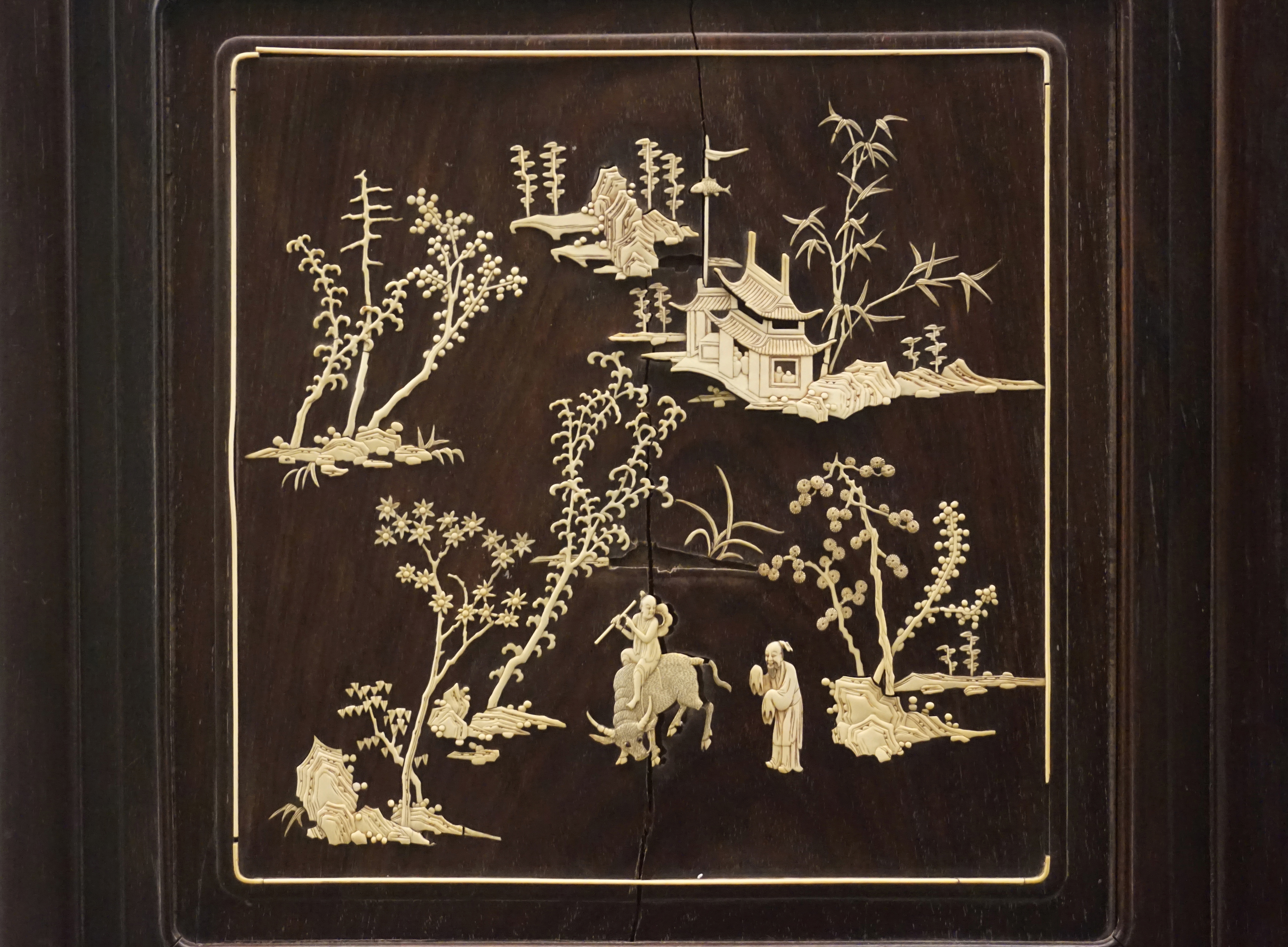
Hongmu panel with ivory inlay depicting landscape and figures, Qing dynasty, Daoguang period (1821–1850)

Gold Chalice of Eternal Stability (金甌永固杯), inlaid with pearls and gemstones, with kui-dragon handles and elephant-head feet, made for the Qianlong Emperor’s New Year writing ceremony. Qing dynasty, Qianlong reign (1736–1795). National Palace Museum

Court beads (chaozhu) of dongzhu freshwater pearls belonging to the Jiaqing Emperor, Qing dynasty. National Palace Museum

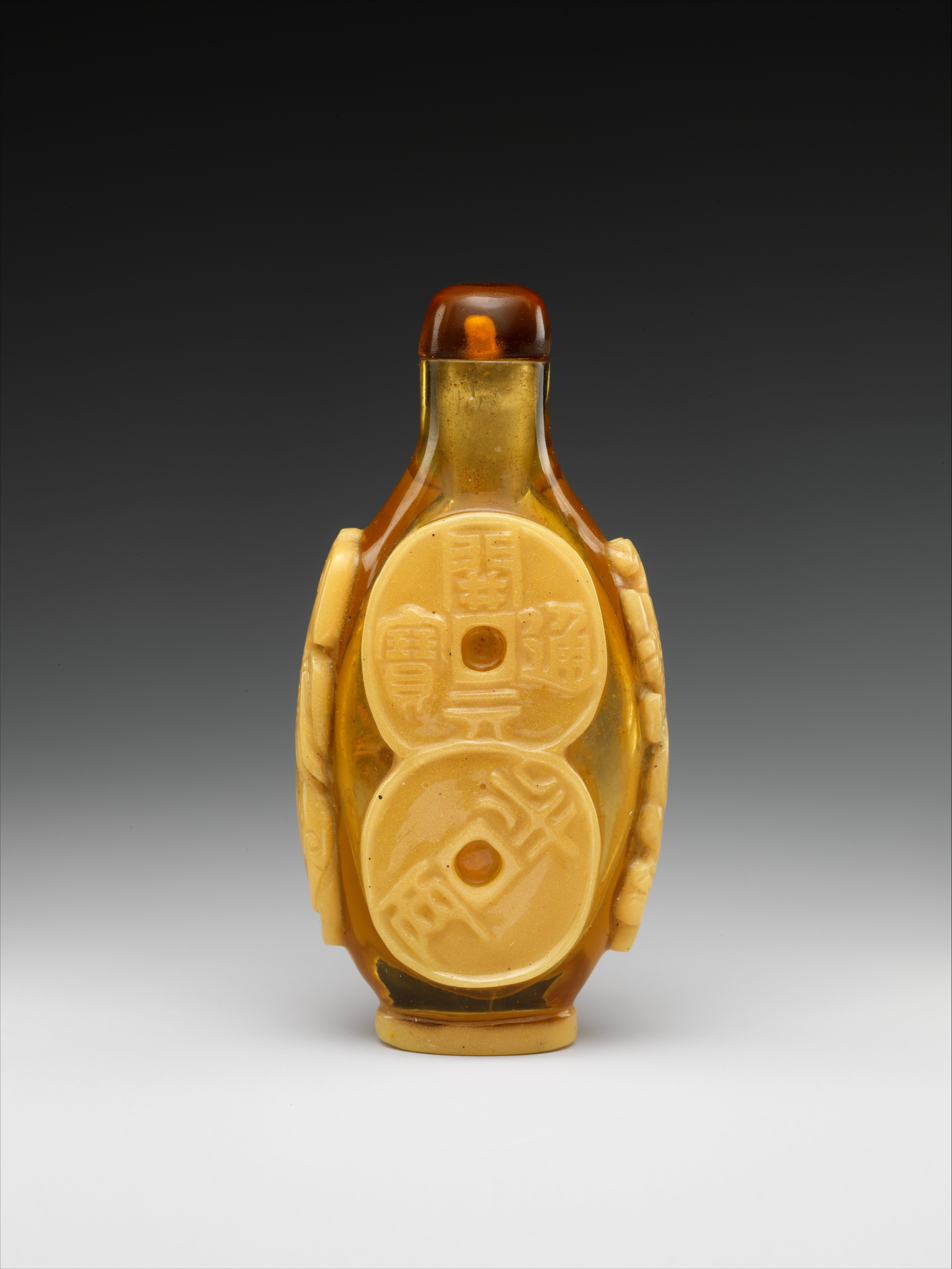
Overlay glass snuff bottle with coin design, Qing dynasty, 19th century. Metropolitan Museum of Art

Inkstick inscribed in gold with Riyue guanghua (“the sun and moon in their splendour”), Qing dynasty. National Palace Museum

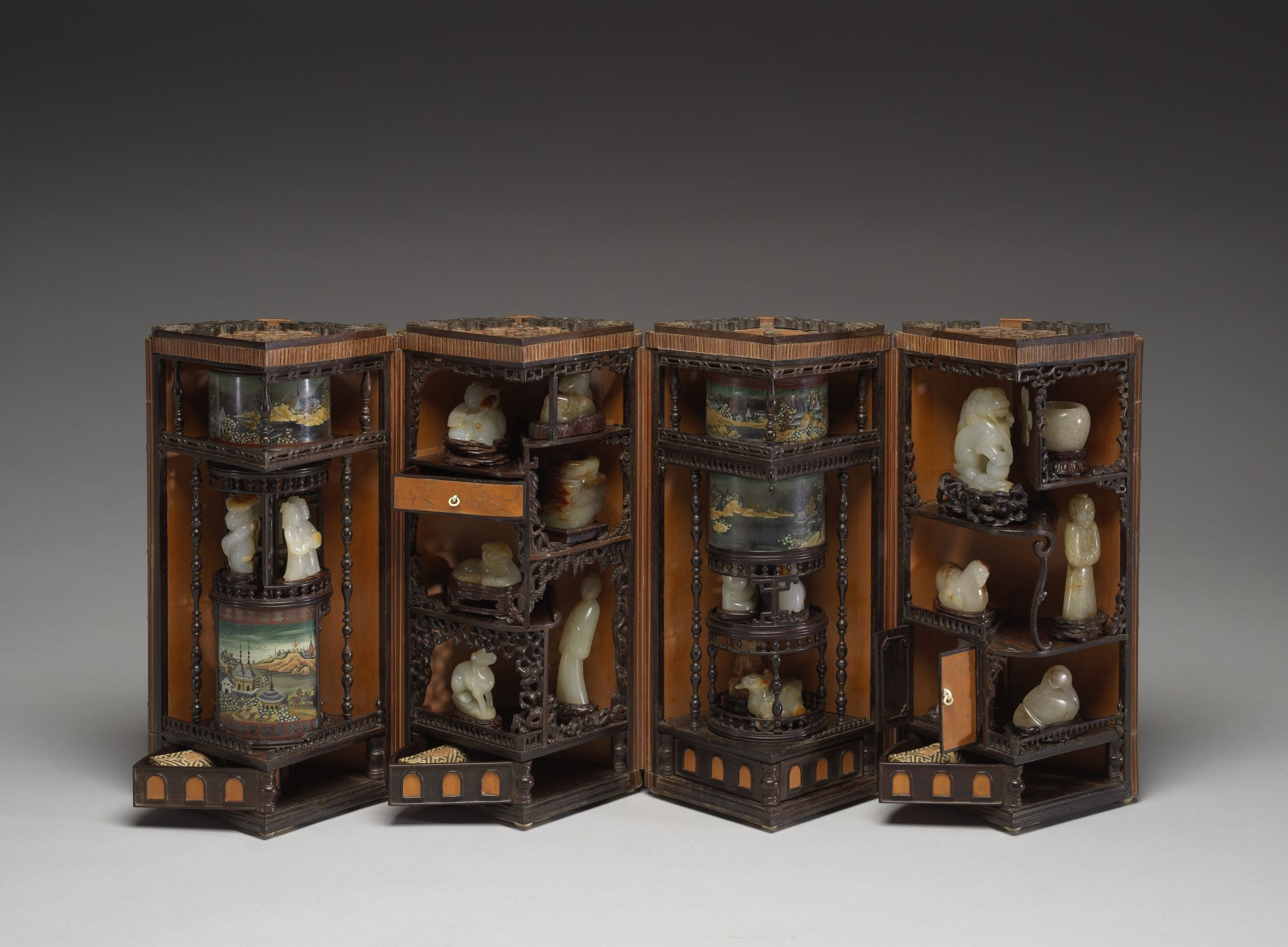
Round bamboo-veneered curio box with lotus scroll decoration, containing 27 curios, Qing dynasty, Qianlong reign (1736–1795). National Palace Museum

Gold diadem (jinyue) of openwork gold cloud mounts, each set with a pearl, alternating with blue segments, worn by women of the Qing imperial household beneath the court hat. Qing dynasty. National Palace Museum

Woman’s short robe of dark blue satin embroidered with flowers and butterflies, with embroidered contrasting borders, China, Qing dynasty (19th century), Cooper Hewitt, Smithsonian Design Museum

Ivory four-tiered food carrier carved in openwork, Qing dynasty, late 18th to early 19th century. National Palace Museum

Songhua inkstone with coiling chi-dragon pattern, Qing dynasty, Qianlong reign (1736–1795). National Palace Museum

Jade table screen with Bodhidharma crossing the Yangtze on a reed, Qing dynasty, Qianlong reign (1736–1795). Metropolitan Museum of Art

Jade boulder carved with Laozi crossing the Hangu Pass, Qing dynasty, 18th century. Metropolitan Museum of Art

Suzhou embroidery panel with a bogu design of antiques, Qing dynasty. Shanghai Museum

== Architecture ==
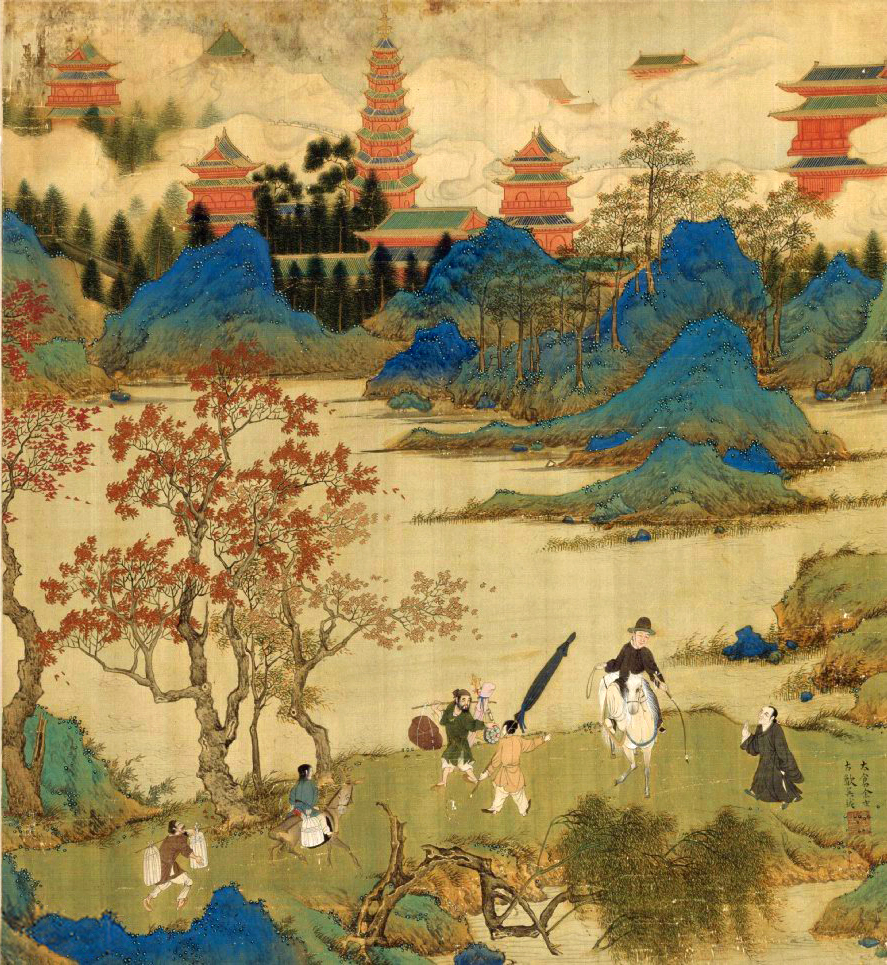
Luming chege (“The Deer Cry Ode Concludes”), a leaf from the Xu Xianqing Huanji Tu album, showing the scene after Xu Xianqing passed the 1567 provincial examination in Yingtian (Nanjing), with the Porcelain Tower of Nanjing visible in the background. Palace Museum

Chinese architecture refers to a style of architecture that has taken shape in East Asia over many centuries. Especially Japan, Korea, Vietnam and Ryukyu. The structural principles of Chinese architecture have remained largely unchanged, the main changes being only the decorative details. Since the Tang dynasty, Chinese architecture has had a major influence on the architectural styles of Korea, Vietnam, and Japan.

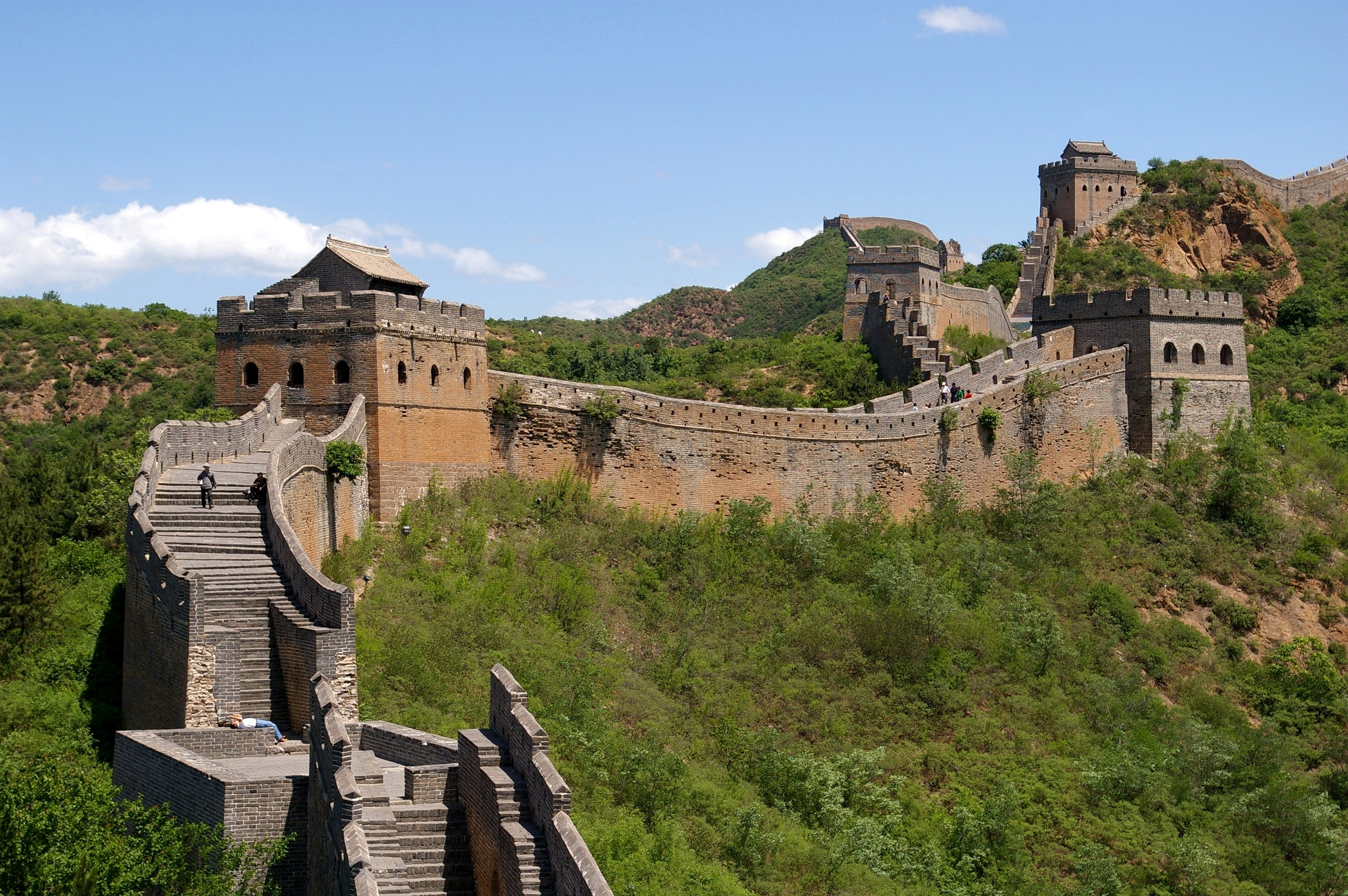
The Great Wall of China, near Jinshanling

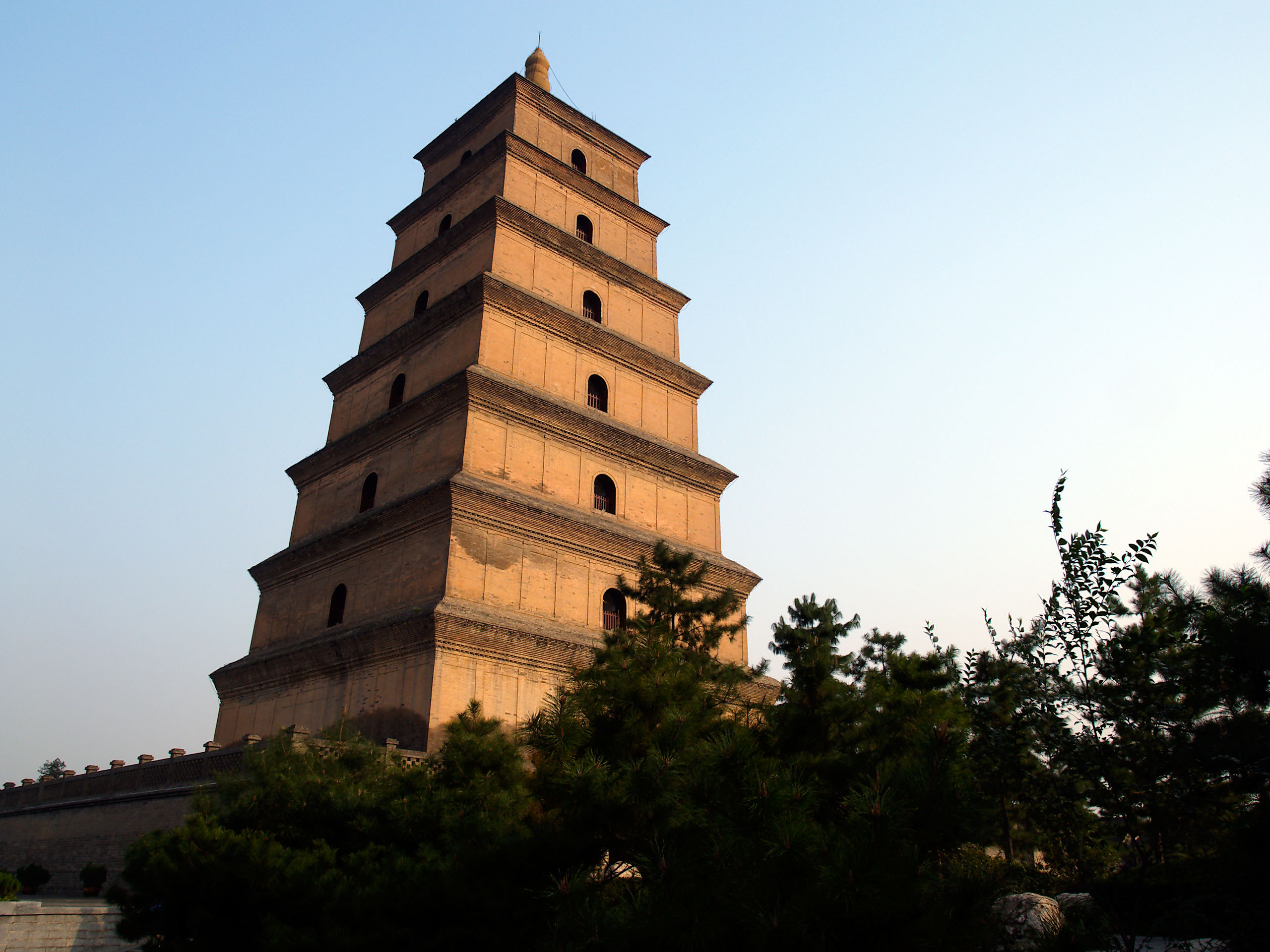
The Giant Wild Goose Pagoda in southern Xi'an (Shaanxi province, China), built in 652 during the Tang dynasty

From the Neolithic era Longshan culture and Bronze Age era Erlitou culture, the earliest rammed earth fortifications exist, with evidence of timber architecture. The subterranean ruins of the palace at Yinxu dates back to the Shang. In historic China, architectural emphasis was laid upon the horizontal axis, in particular the construction of a heavy platform and a large roof that floats over this base, with the vertical walls not as well emphasized. This contrasts Western architecture, which tends to grow in height and depth. Chinese architecture stresses the visual impact of the width of the buildings. The deviation from this standard is the tower architecture of the Chinese tradition, which began as a native tradition and was eventually influenced by the Buddhist building for housing religious sutras—the stupa—which came from Nepal. Ancient Chinese tomb model representations of multiple story residential towers and watchtowers date to the Han. However, the earliest extant Buddhist Chinese pagoda is the Songyue Pagoda, a 40 m (130 ft) tall circular-based brick tower built in Henan in the year 523 CE From the 6th century onwards, stone-based structures become more common, while the earliest are from stone and brick arches found in Han dynasty tombs. The Zhaozhou Bridge built from 595 to 605 CEis China's oldest extant stone bridge, as well as the world's oldest fully stone open-spandrel segmental arch bridge.

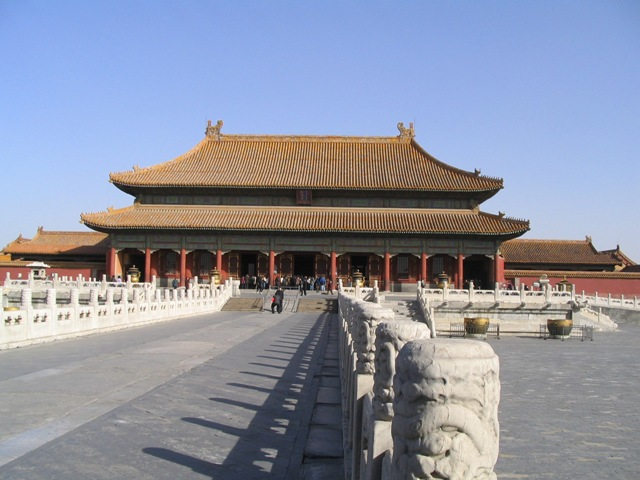
Inside the Forbidden City, an example of Chinese architecture from the 15th century

The vocational trade of architect, craftsman, and engineer was not as highly respected in premodern Chinese society as the scholar-bureaucrats who were drafted into the government by the civil service examination system. Much of the knowledge about early Chinese architecture was passed on from one tradesman to his son or associative apprentice. However, there were several early treatises on architecture in China, with encyclopedic information on architecture dating back to the Han dynasty. The height of the classical Chinese architectural tradition in writing and illustration can be found in the Yingzao Fashi, a building manual written by 1100 and published by Li Jie (1065–1110) in 1103. In it there are numerous and meticulous illustrations and diagrams showing the assembly of halls and building components, as well as classifying structure types and building components.

There were certain architectural features that were reserved solely for buildings built for the Emperor of China. One example is the use of yellow roof tiles; yellow having been the Imperial color, yellow roof tiles still adorn most of the buildings within the Forbidden City. The Temple of Heaven, however, uses blue roof tiles to symbolize the sky. The roofs are almost invariably supported by brackets, a feature shared only with the largest of religious buildings. The wooden columns of the buildings, as well as the surface of the walls, tend to be red in colour.

Modern Chinese architecture has been shaped by multiple influences: Soviet-style architecture dominated the 1950s, exemplified by the Ten Great Buildings of Beijing (1959); since the Reform and Opening (1978), post-modern and Western styles have become prevalent, with international architects such as I. M. Pei, Rem Koolhaas, and Zaha Hadid contributing major projects.

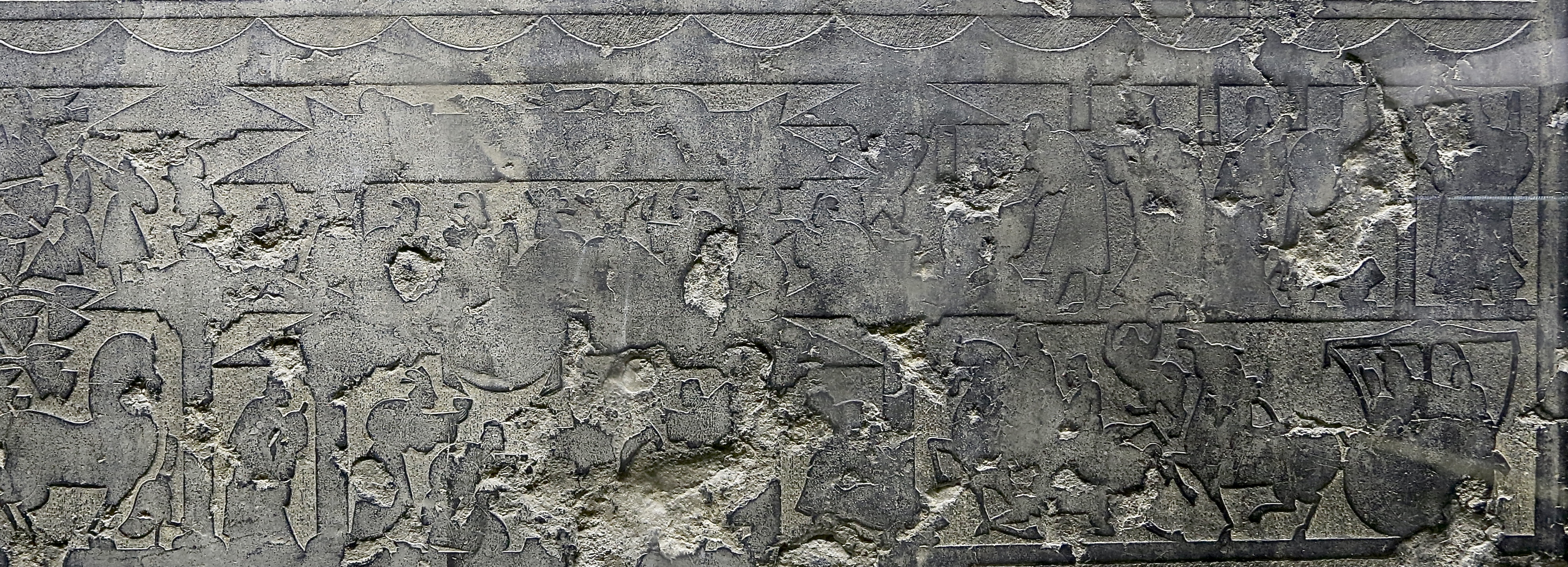
Relief from the Wu Family Shrines (Jiaxiang County, Shandong) that shows Han dynasty architecture, 151 CE

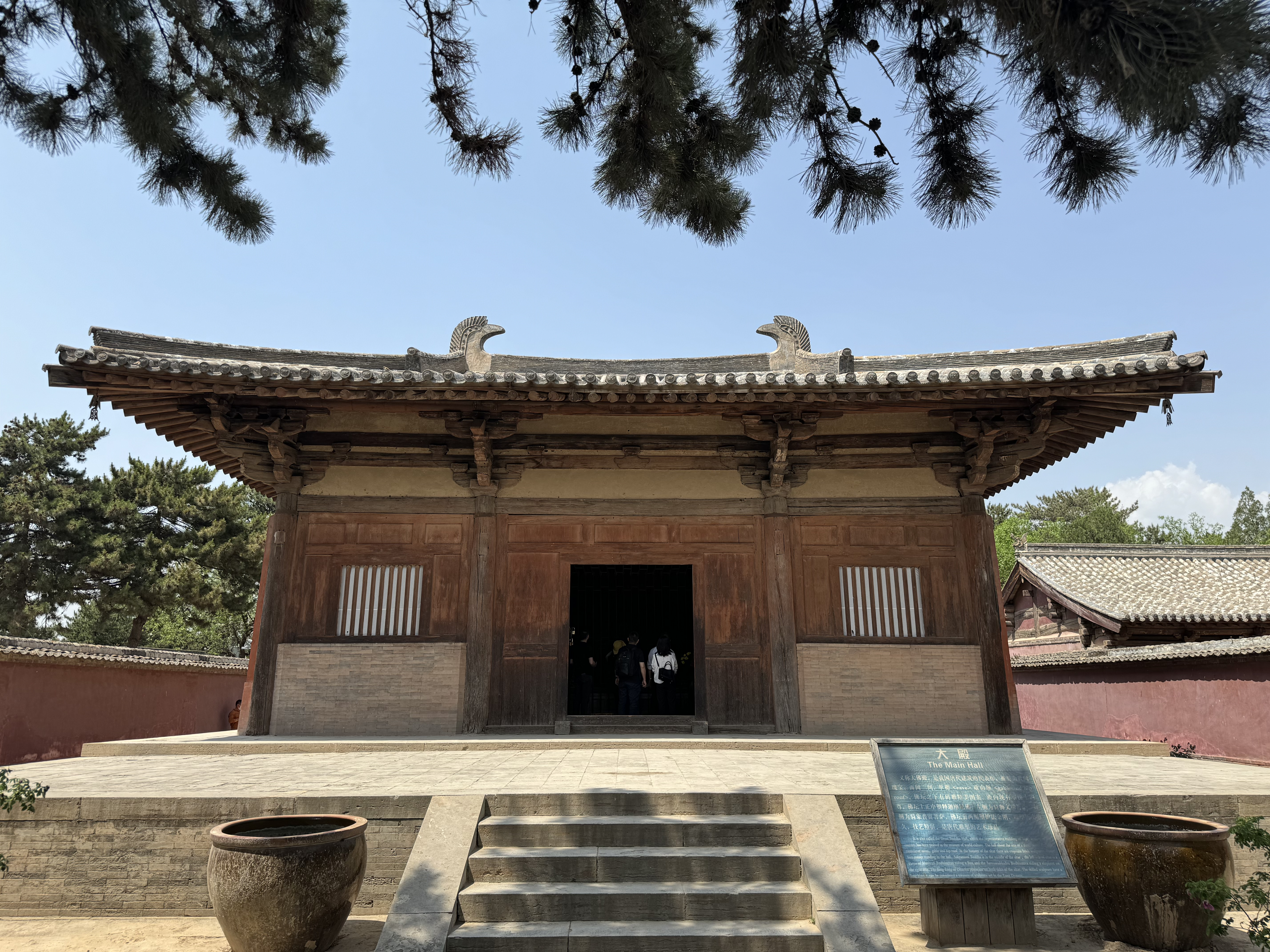
Great Hall of Nanchan Temple, Shanxi, Tang dynasty, 782 CE. The oldest surviving wooden building in China.

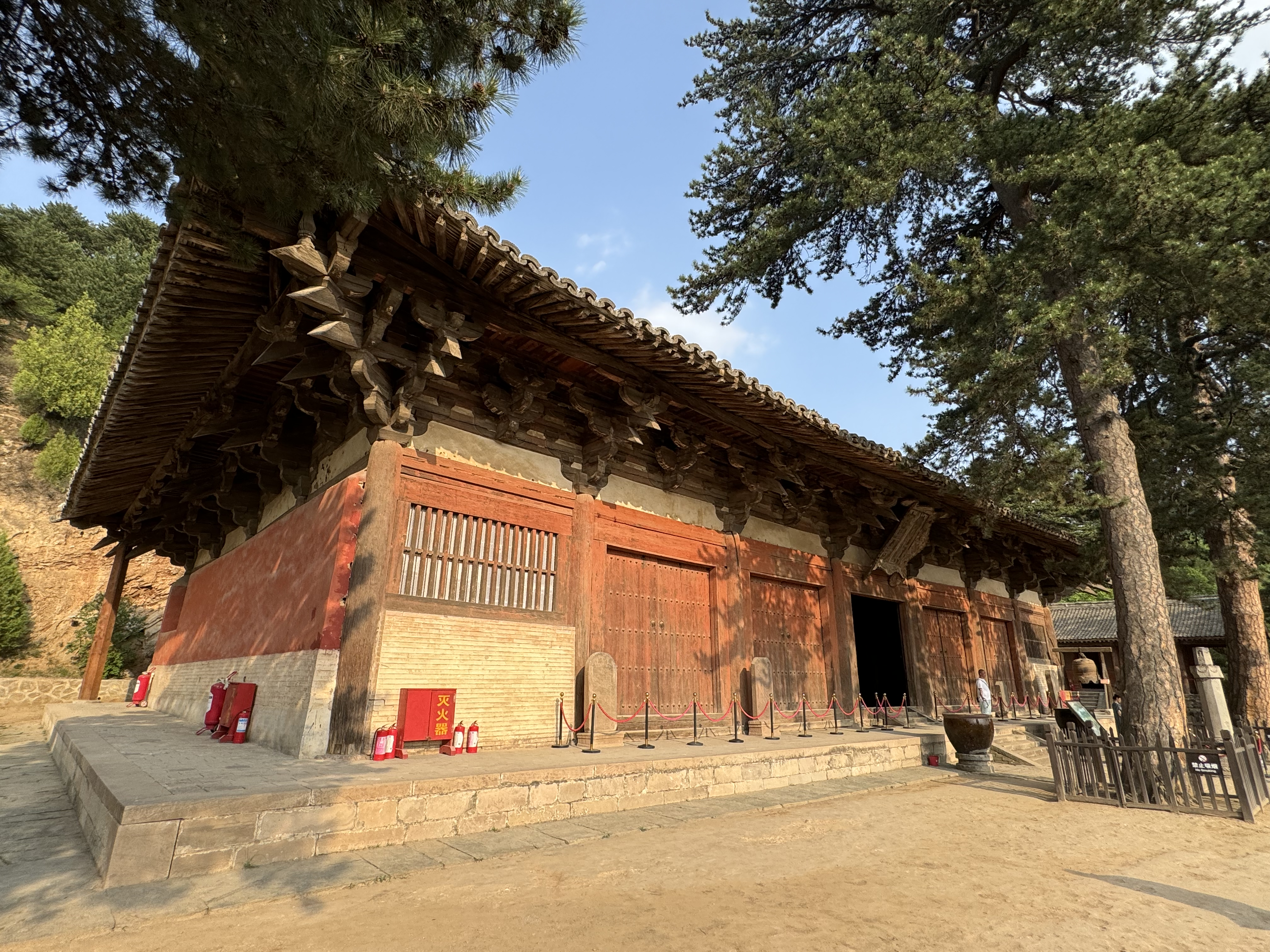
The East Main Hall of Foguang Temple, Shanxi, constructed in 857 CE; one of only three surviving wooden building from the Tang dynasty in China

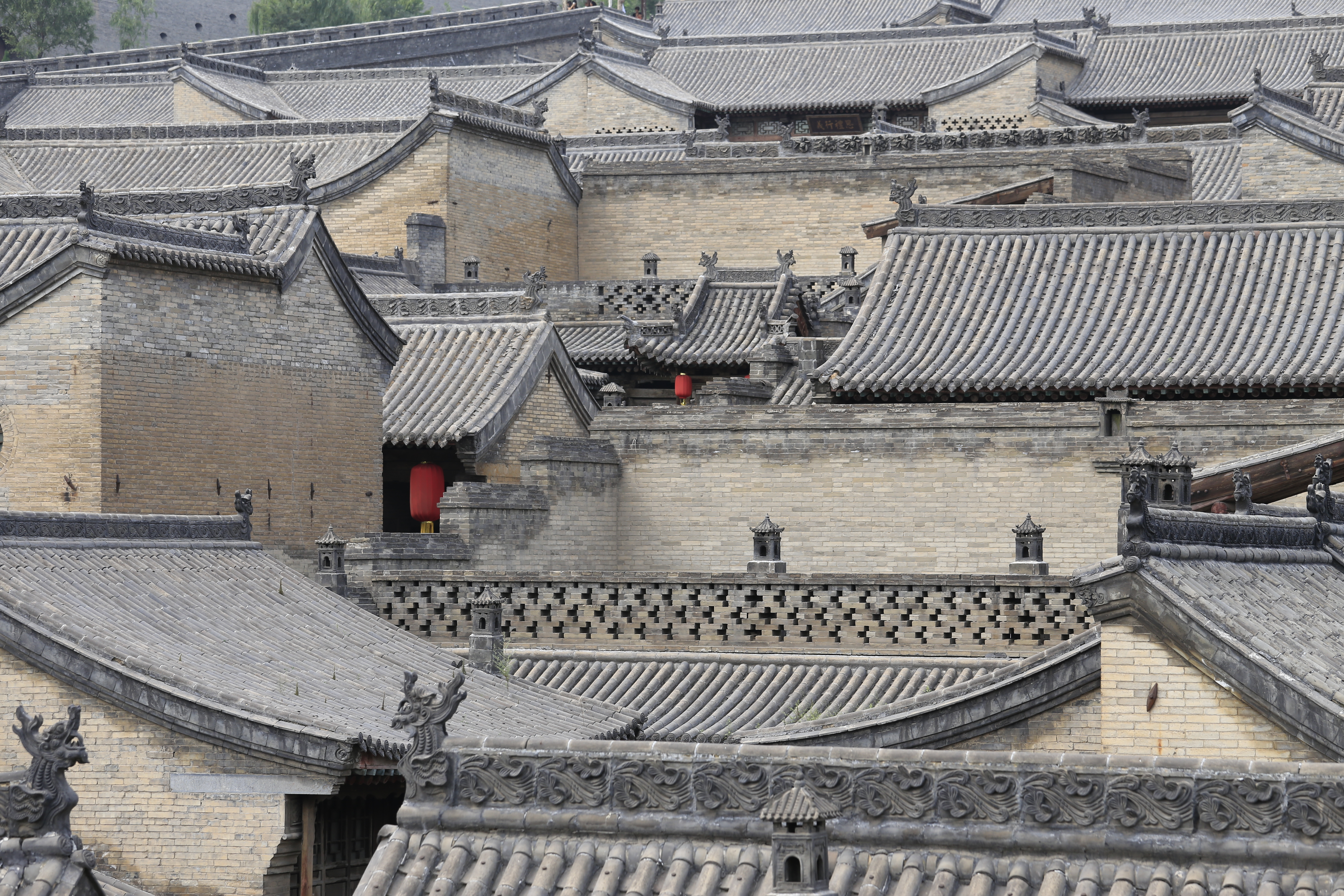
Wang Family Compound

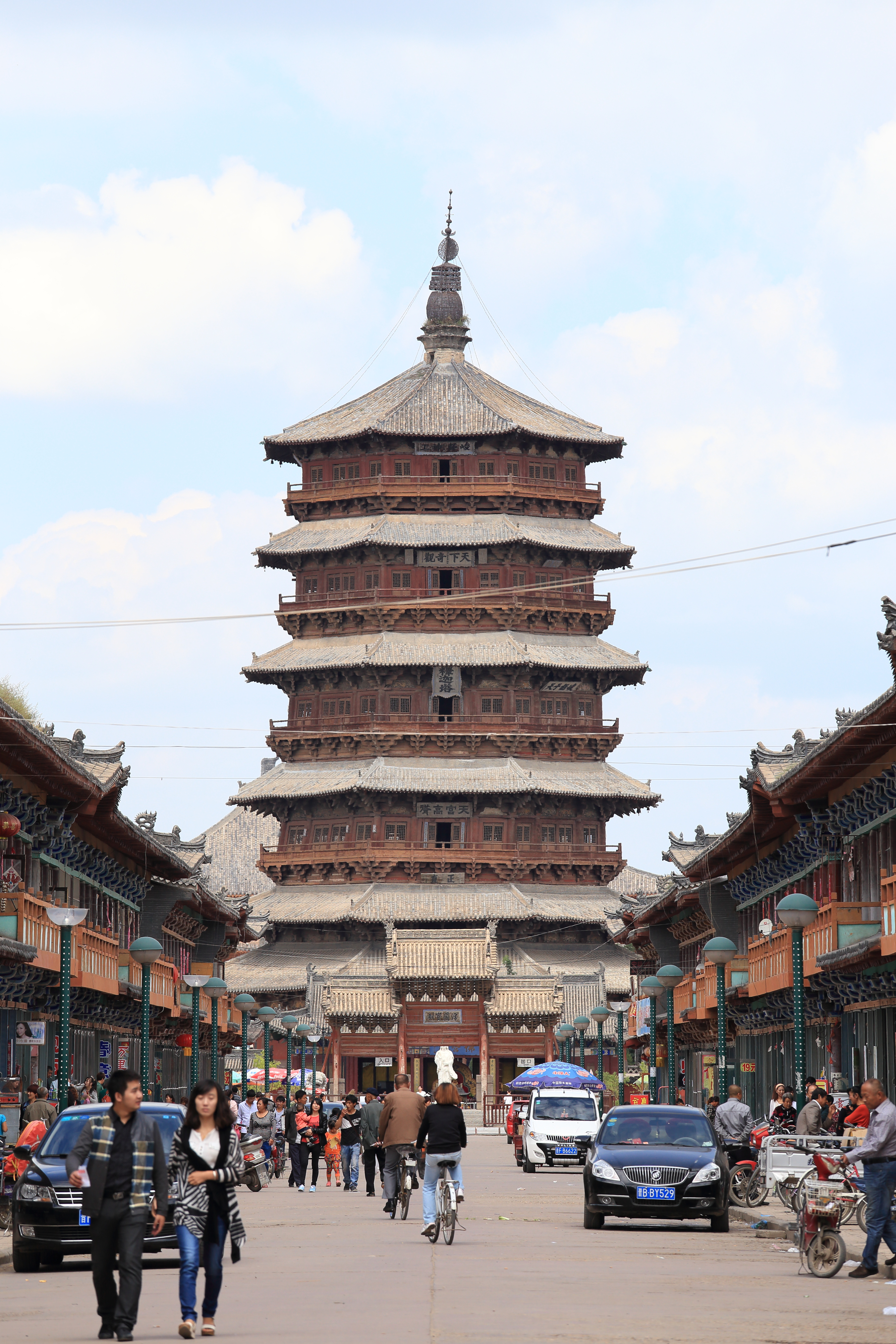
Pagoda of Fogong Temple, Shanxi, 1056

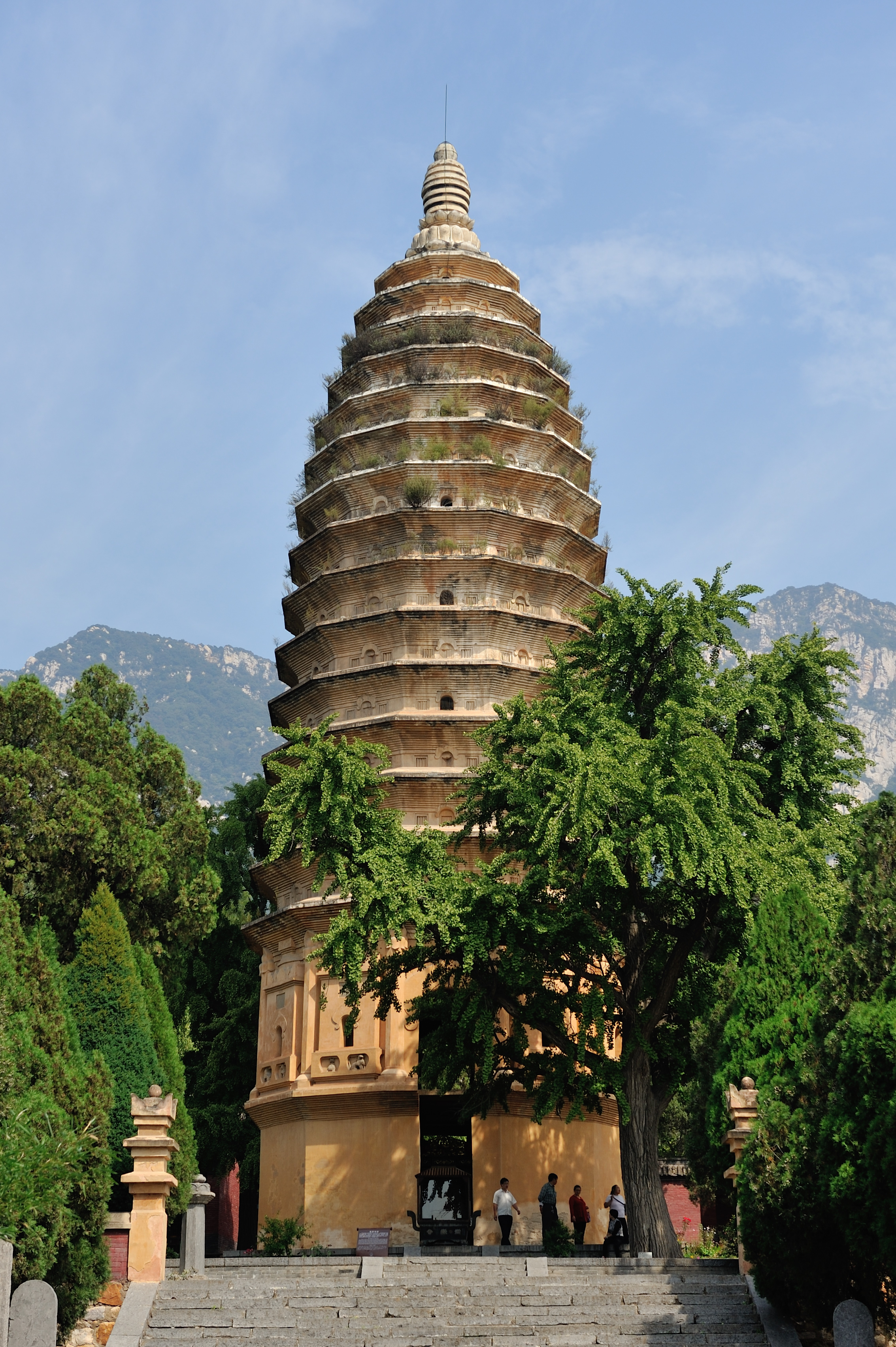
The Songyue Pagoda, Henan, 523

Hall of Prayer for Good Harvests, the main building of the Temple of Heaven (Beijing), 1703–1790

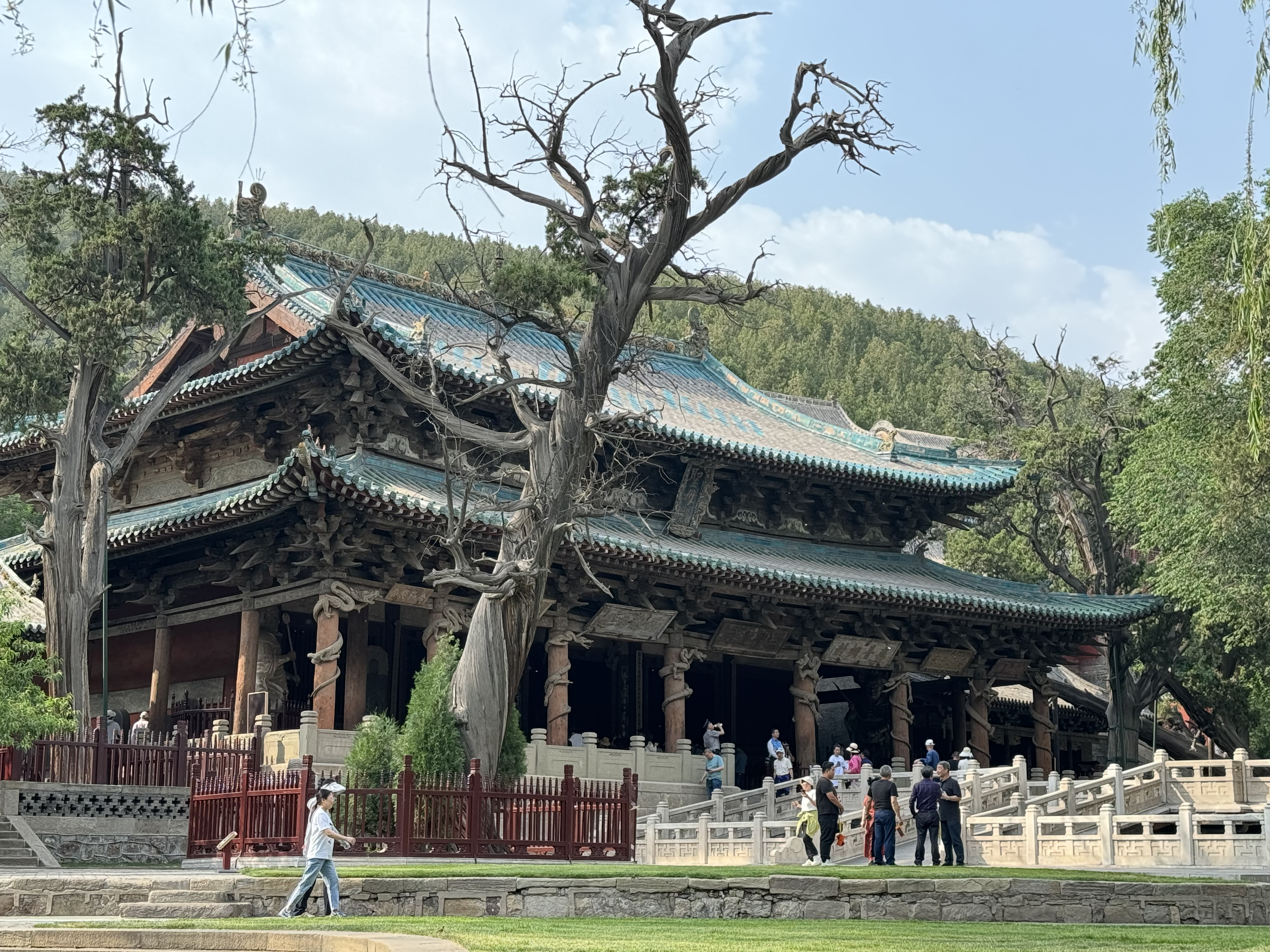
Hall of Sacred Mother, Jinci, 1102

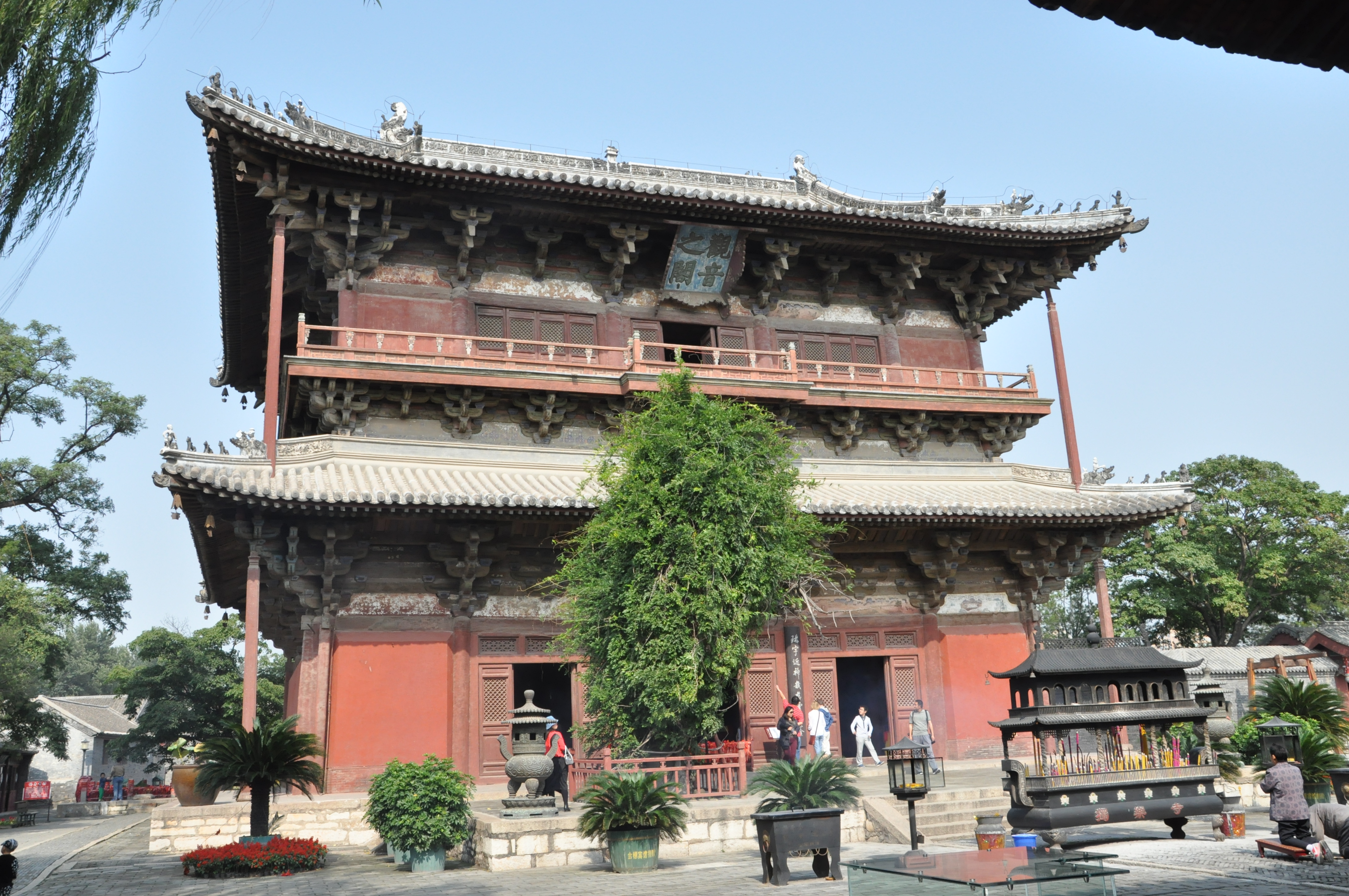
The Guanyian Pavilion of the Dule Monastery (Jixian, China), 984

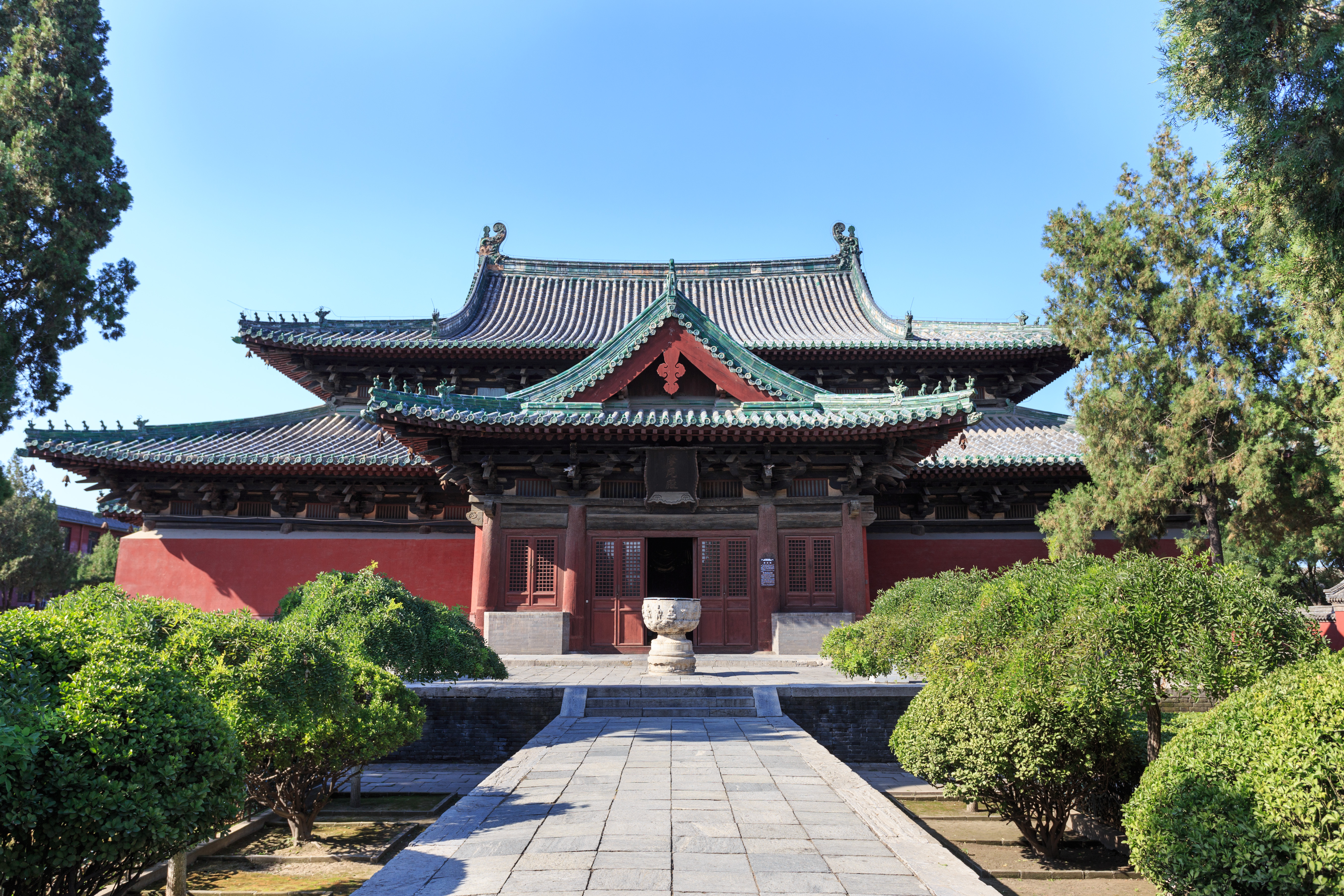
The Longxing Temple in Hebei (Zhengding, China), 1052

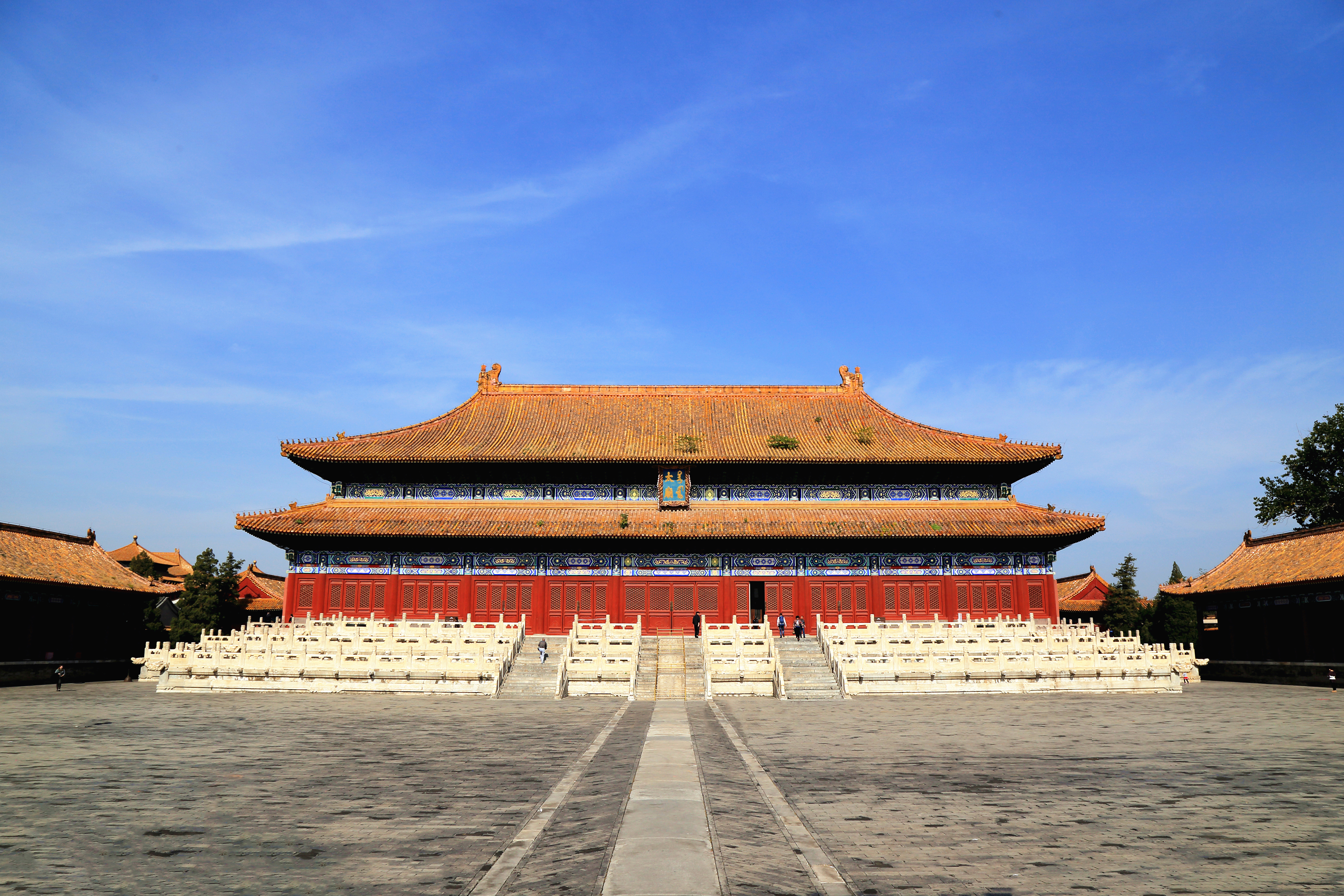
The main hall of the Imperial Ancestral Temple, Beijing, 1545

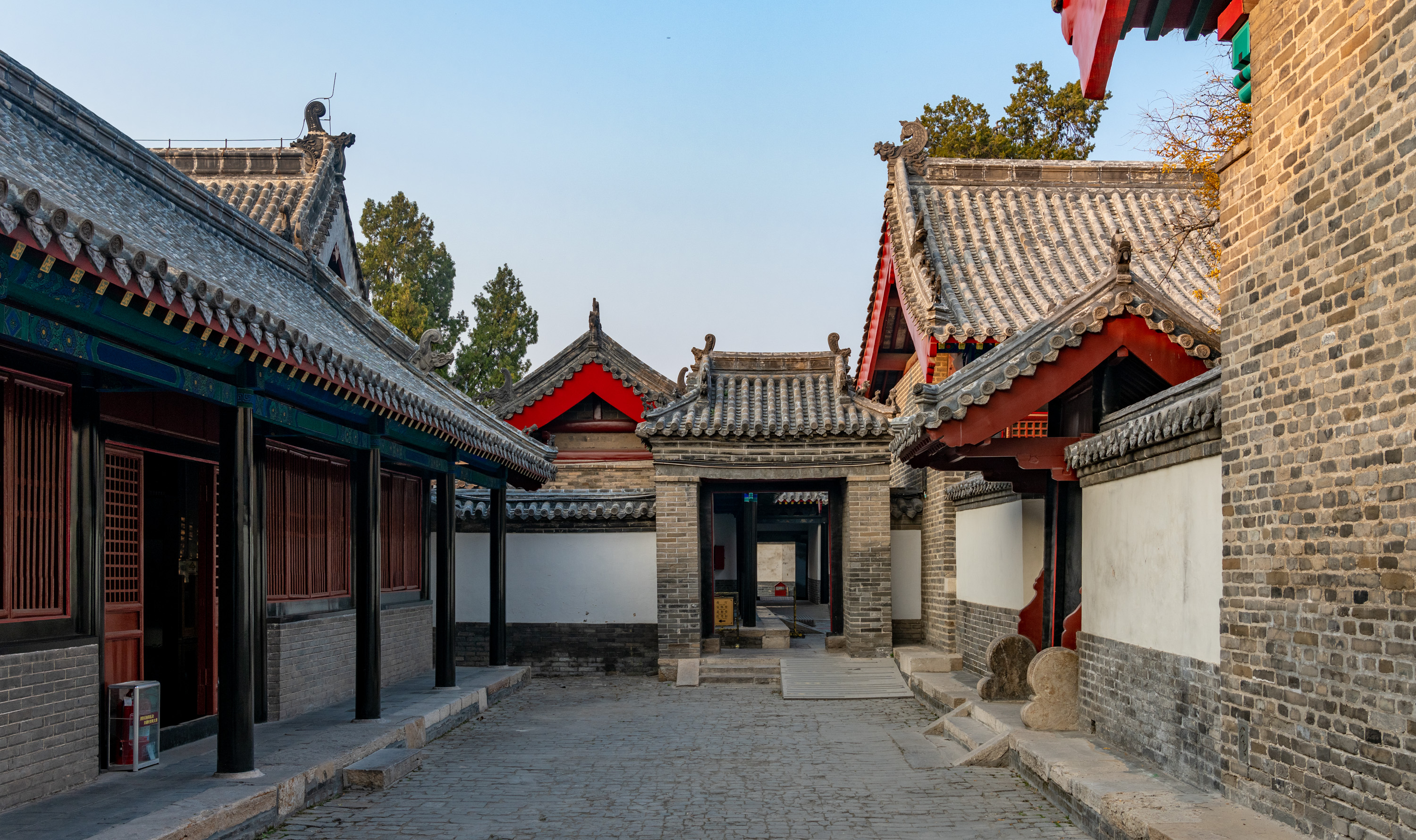
A courtyard in the Kong Family Mansion, Qufu, Shandong, looking toward a brick gateway leading to the next courtyard

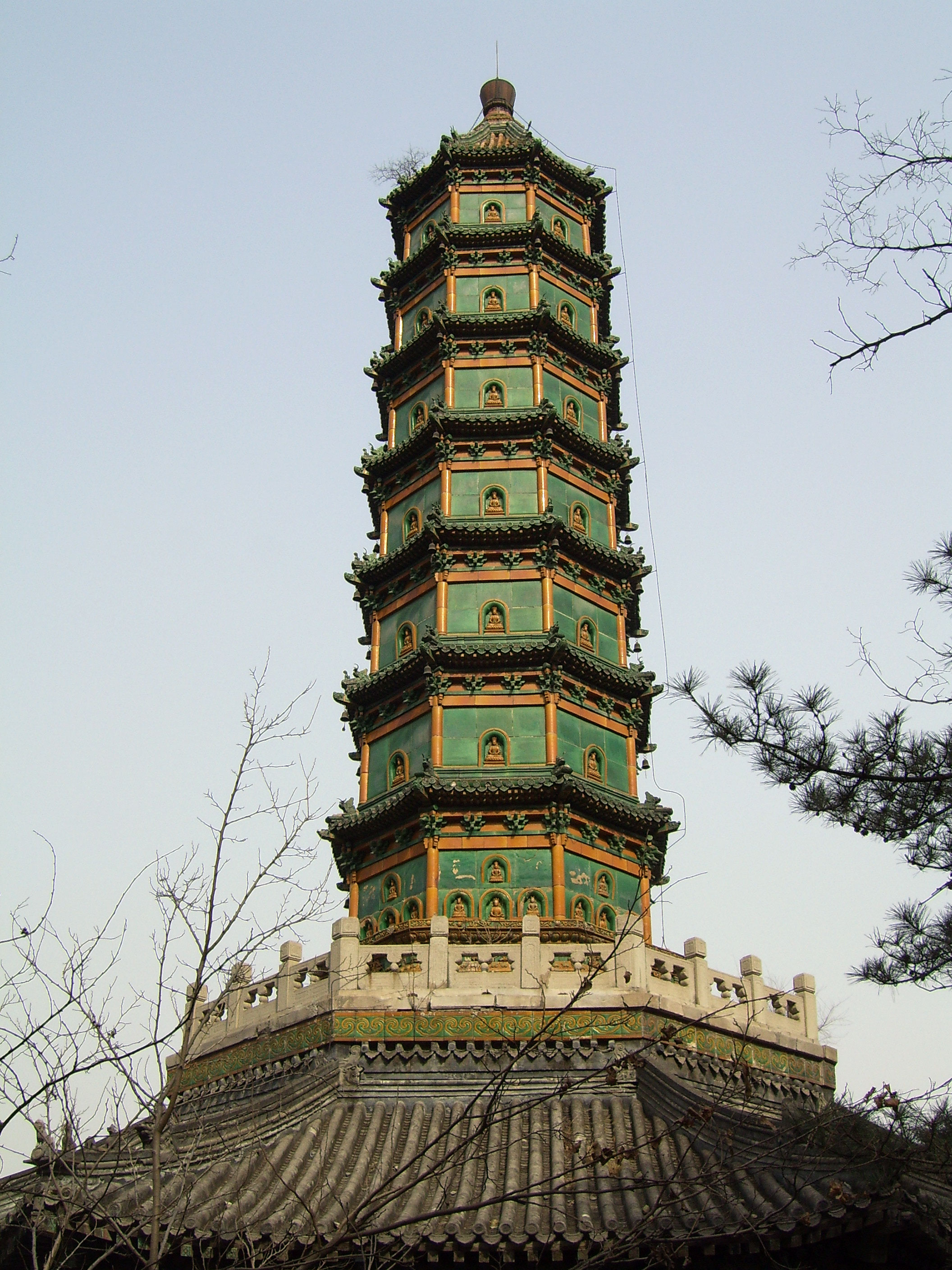
The Fragrant Hills Pagoda, a glazed-tile pagoda in Fragrant Hills Park, Beijing

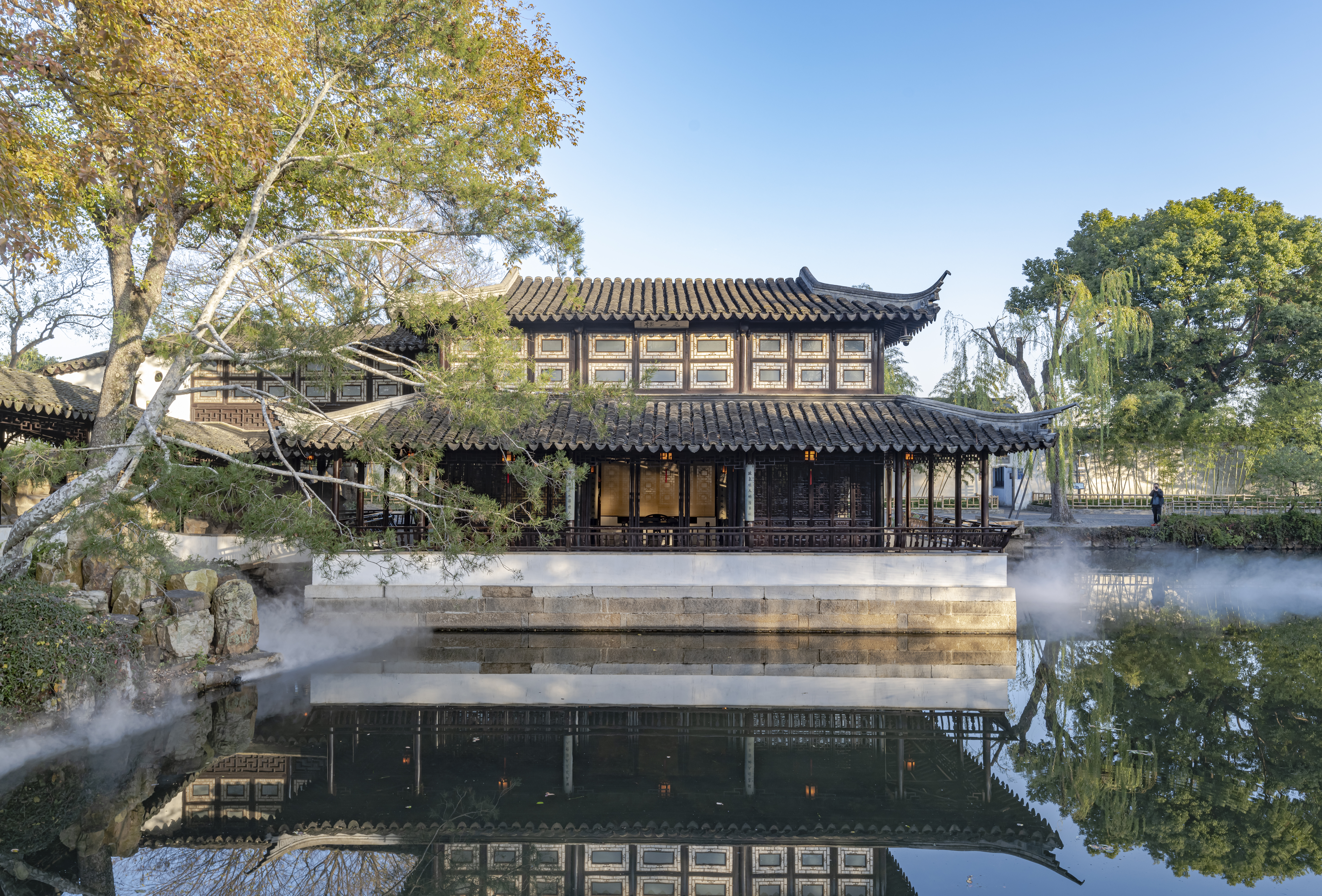
Jianshan Lou in the Humble Administrator’s Garden, Suzhou

== Modern Chinese art ==
=== New China art (1912–1949) ===
Sanmao, one of the most well-known comic book characters in China

==== Modern art movement ====
The movement to modernize Chinese art started toward the end of the Qing dynasty. The traditional art form started to lose its appeal as the feudalistic structure of the society was dissolving. The modern view of the world had to be expressed in a different form. The explorations went on two main paths: one was to draw from the past to enrich the present (汲古潤今)*, the other was to "learn the new methods" (學習新法).*

Cover of The Citizen (國民雜誌), Vol. 1, No. 10, 1941

===== Draw from the past =====
The literati art for the social elite was not appealing to the bourgeois patrons. Wu Changshuo (1844–1927) was among the Shanghai-based artists responsible for flowers and plants as the subject matter. His paintings used bold colors and energetic brush strokes, making them more accessible to the general public. Qi Baishi (1864–1957) painted images like crabs and shrimps that were even more approachable to the common people. Huang Binhong (1865–1955) denounced the literati paintings of the Qing dynasty and created his own style of landscape paintings by extensive investigations in Chinese art history. Zhang Daqian (1899–1983) used wall paintings in the Dunhuang (敦煌) caves to help him move beyond the literati tradition.

===== Learn new methods =====
The Lingnan School (岭南画派) made some borrowings from the language of Western art in their ink paintings. Gao Jianfu (1879–1951), one of the founders of Lingnan School, was an active participant in the revolutionary movement of Sun Yat-sen (1866–1925). He was innovative in that he intended to use his paintings to highlight national issues, a medium for positive change in society.

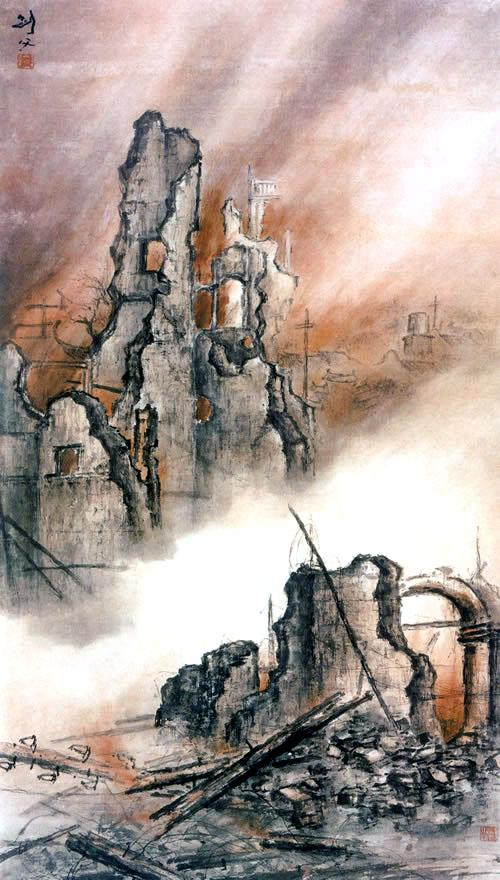
Flames on the Eastern Battlefront by Gao Jianfu, 1937 ink and colors on paper

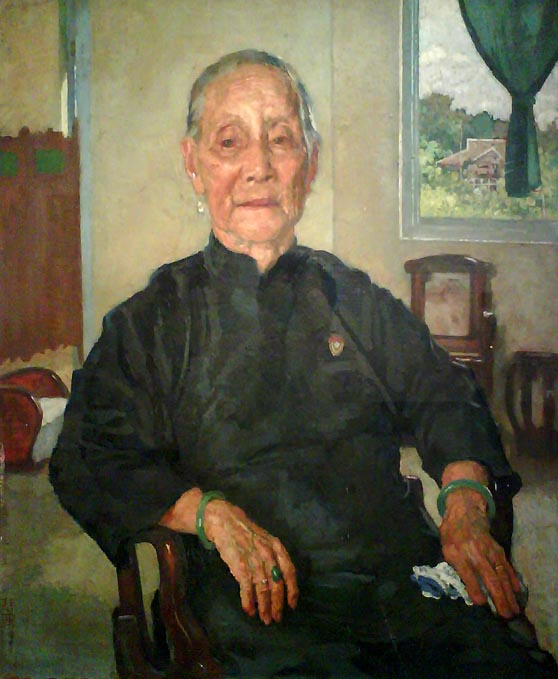
Portrait of Madam Cheng (1941), oil on board, Xu Beihong

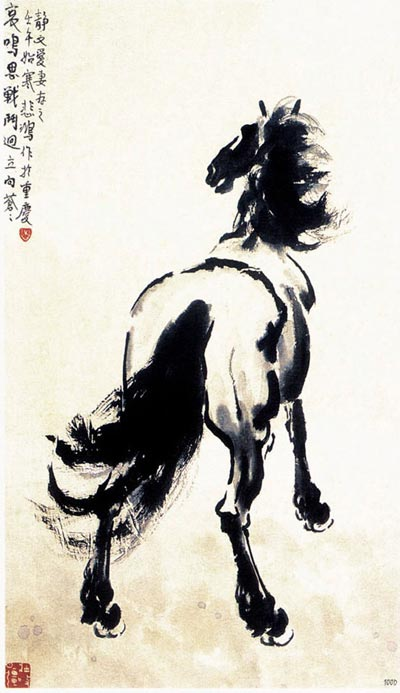
Warhorse by Xu Beihong

A more radical style change started with Kang Youwei (1858–1927), a reformer who admired the more reality-based art of the Song dynasty. He believed that Chinese art could be rejuvenated by employing the reality-oriented art techniques of Europe. Xu Beihong (1895–1953) took this idea to heart and went to Paris to acquire the necessary skills. Liu Haisu (1896–1994), on the other hand, went to Japan to learn western techniques. Both Xu, and Liu became presidents of prestigious art schools, instilling new concepts and skills in the next generation of artists. Cai Yuanpei (1868–1940) was one of the leaders in the New Culture Movement (新文化运动). Those involved believed that intellectual activities should benefit all, not just the elites. Cai's belief that art could play a public, socially reformist role was adopted by Lin Fengmian (1900–1991).

Together with Yan Wenliang (1893–1988), Xu, Liu, and Lin were considered the "Four Great Academy Presidents" (四大校長), who spearheaded the national modern art movement. However, the subsequent upheaval caused by the Sino–Japanese war and the civil war did not allow this movement to grow. The Chinese modern art movement after the war developed differently in the four the regions: the Mainland, Taiwan, Hong Kong, and overseas.

=== Postwar Chinese art (1949–1976) ===
The postwar era is roughly from 1949, the end of Chinese civil war, to 1976, the opening of mainland China to the outside world.

==== Mainland ====
The postwar era in mainland China could be divided into two periods: 1949 to 1966 is generally called "The 17 Years"; 1966 to 1976 is the period of the "Cultural Revolution".

===== The 17 Years =====
Chinese artists adopted social realism as a form of expression; it was a combination of revolutionary realism and revolutionary romanticism. Artwork was not valued on its own terms but was subservient to a political purpose. According to Mao Zedong, art should be a "powerful weapon for uniting and educating the people, fighting and destroying the enemy". Praising political leaders and celebrating the achievements of socialism became the theme of all artwork. Western art forms, including Cubism, Fauvism, Abstraction, and Expressionism were deemed superficial and were categorized as formalism.

The biggest blow to art was the Anti-Rightist Campaign of 1957. Artists who were labeled as rightists were stripped of their right to create and even their jobs, and worse, the social standing of the artists and their families was placed at the lowest level, causing great mental suffering.

Some influential paintings from this period are:

- Li Keran, Reddening of Ten Thousand Mountains (李可染《万山红遍》)
- Huang Zhou, The Snowstorm (黄胄《洪荒风雪》)
- Dong Xiwen, The Founding Ceremony of the Nation (董希文《开国大典》) had gone through several revisions, due to the changing political situation. Gao Gang was taken out when he went out of favor, Liu Shaoqi was replaced by Dong Biwu for a while, then the prototype was restored.

===== Cultural Revolution =====
These ten years could also be called the "Ten Years of Calamity" (十年浩劫). In order to destroy everything that supported the old social order, countless temples, historic sites, artworks, and books were ravaged and burnt. During this period the portrait of Mao and propaganda posters of revolution were everywhere. Anything that was remotely suspected of being out of line was destroyed, and the person behind it was prosecuted. For example, Owl by Huang Yongyu had one eye open and one eye closed; it was deemed an expression of dissatisfaction with current events. Zong Qixiang's painting, which shows three tigers, was deemed critical of the leader Lin Biao, whose name contained a character that had three tigers in it. Residual Lotus by Li Kuchan had eight lotus flowers; it was deemed to be critical of the eight communist approved movies (样板戏). Many prominent artists were persecuted during this time. For example, Yan, Xu, Liu, and Lin, the "Four Great Academy Presidents" 四大校長 (except for Xu who died before the Cultural Revolution), were all prosecuted and jailed, and all their work was destroyed during this time. However, despite the difficult environment, some noteworthy paintings were created. The following are some examples:

- Chen Yifei, The Yellow River (陈逸飞《黄河颂》)
- Sun Jingbo, New Song by Ah Xi (孙景波《阿细新歌》)

==== Hong Kong ====
Hong Kong was a British colony from 1842 to 1997. The local art organizations were mostly run by Westerners who outnumbered Chinese painters until a large migration of Chinese from Southern China during Sino–Japanese War. Innovative art colleges were established after the war. The shows organized by local artists started in the early 1960s. After a reaction against the traditional Western artistic practices of the 1940s and the 1950s, some experimental works that combined both western and eastern techniques were made. Then came the call for a return to Chinese traditional art and the creation of forms of art that Hong Kong could call its own. The trend was led by Lui Shou Kwan. Some western concepts were incorporated into his Chinese ink paintings.

- Lui Shou Kwan, 1965

==== Overseas ====
===== Paris =====
Many Chinese artists went to study western art in Paris in the early 1900s, for example: Fang Ganmin (方幹民), Wu Dayu (吳大羽), Ong Schan Tchow (翁占秋), Lin Fengmian (林風眠), Yan Wenliang (顏文樑), Wu Guanzhong (吳冠中), Zao Wou-Ki (趟無極). All except Zao completed their education before 1949 and returned to become leaders in the modern art movement. (Zao happened to be in Paris in 1949 and did not return.) Some Chinese artists went to stay there because of the rich international art environment, for example: Sanyu, Pan Yuliang (潘玉良), Chu Teh-Chun (朱德群). Zao, Sanyu, Pang, and Chu all had shows in Paris and the Republic. All their paintings had varying degrees of Chinese elements in them. These artists not only had a profound influence in Chinese modern art, but they also continued to engage Parisians with modern art from the East.

- Zao Wou-Ki, 1959

===== United States =====
Li Tiefu (1869–1952) was an accomplished oil painter educated in Canada and the United States. He was an active participant in the revolutionary movement of Sun Yat-sen (1866–1925).

Zeng Youhe 曾佑和 (1925–2017) was born in Beijing. She started receiving international recognition in 1946, when Michael Sullivan began praising and writing about her work. Zeng moved to Honolulu in 1949 and visited Hong Kong and Taiwan in 1960. Like those of the Fifth Moon Group (五月畫會), her paintings were abstract; but the flavor of traditional Chinese ink paintings were not as pronounced.

- Zeng Youhe, 1961

===== Taiwan =====
Because of its history, traditional Chinese art does not have strong roots in Taiwan. The art forms in Taiwan were generally decorative, until youths growing up under the Japanese occupation received formal art education in Japan. Not burdened with traditional art form, their exploration generally followed the path of "learning the new methods" (學習新法). When the Nationalists arrived in Taiwan, a group of ambitious youths who came with the Nationalists continued the modern art movement. The most notable were the Fifth Moon Group (五月畫會) and the Ton-Fan Art Group (東方畫會).

====== Fifth Moon Group ======
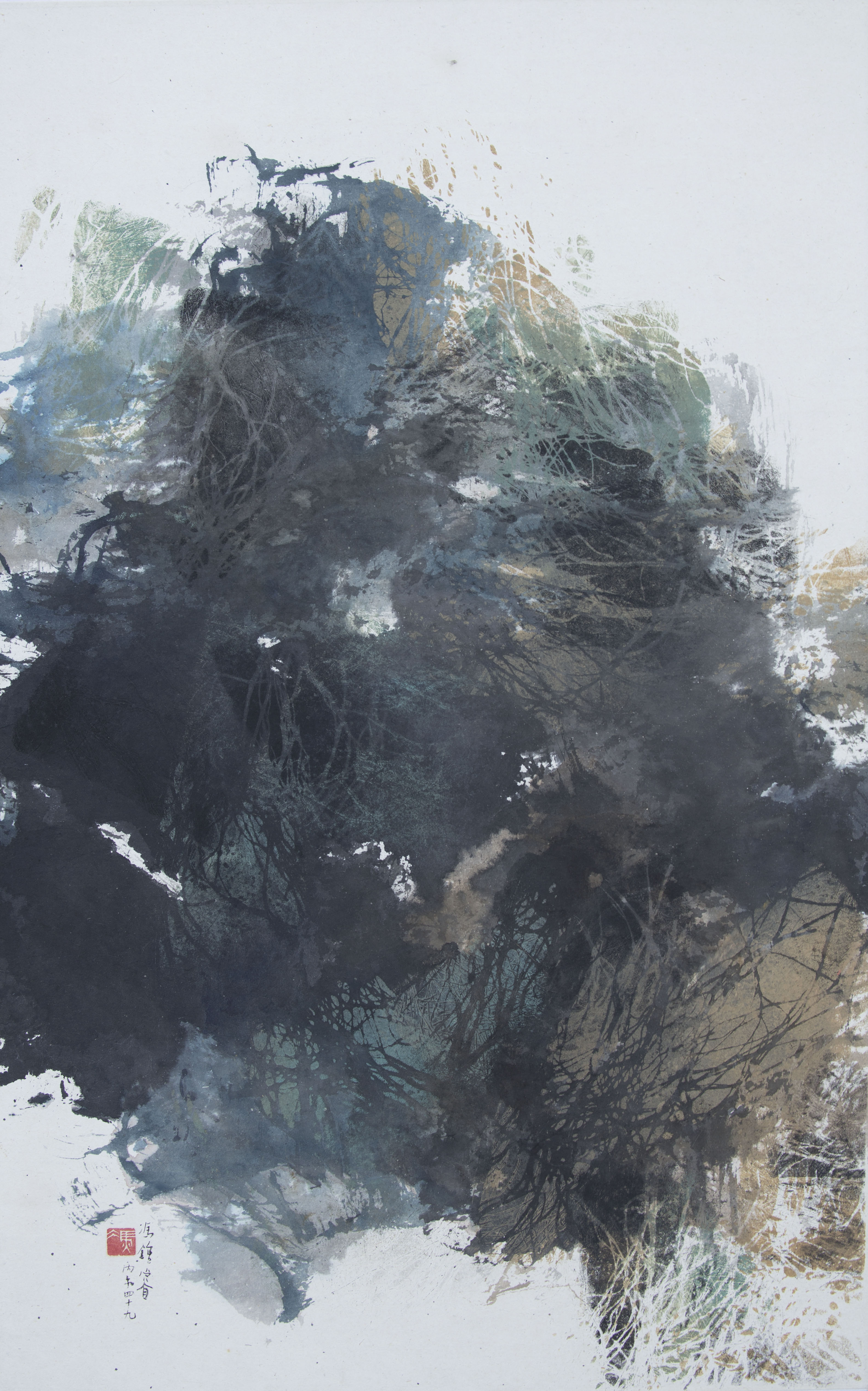
Fong Chung-ray, ink on paper, 1966

The original members of the group were alumni with art majors from the Academic Teachers College (師範大學), the only university with an art major at the time. Their first intention was to show that the effort to create new art was worthwhile in itself, even if it did not directly enhance art pedagogy. Later, it became a movement to modernize Chinese art.

The members of the Fifth Moon Group studied western art movements, and concluded that the abstract art form was the best medium for modern Chinese art. They felt the best the Chinese paintings were ones that de-emphasized realistic representation, and emphasized atmosphere and "vividness", which comes from the brush strokes and the natural interaction between ink and paper. To further that idea, one does not need representation of objects in painting, or strictly use ink and paper. The beauty of a painting can be appreciated directly from the forms, textures, and colors on the canvas without their relation to real objects. The group was active from 1957 to 1972. The main members are Liu Guosong, Chuang Che (莊喆), Hu Chi-Chung (胡奇中), Fong Chung-ray (馮鍾睿), and Han Hsiang-ning.

====== Ton-Fan Art Group (東方畫會) ======
The members of this group were students who attended private art classes offered by Li Zhongsheng (李仲生), a mainland-born artist who had been one of the active participants in the modern art movement. He and a number of mainland artists who painted in a western style continued the modern art movement by publishing magazines and writing articles to introduce modern art to Taiwan. His teaching style was unconventional and socratic in nature.

The original intention of the group was to introduce modern art to the public. They believed there should be no restriction on the form or style of a modern Chinese painting, as long as the painting expressed meaning that was Chinese in nature. The group was active from 1957 to 1971. The main members were: Ho Kan (霍剛), Li Yuan-chia, Wu Hao (吳昊), Oyan Wen-Yuen (歐陽文苑), Hsia Yan (夏陽), Hsiao Chin (蕭勤), Tommy Chen (陳道明), and Hsiao Ming-Hsien (蕭明賢). The following are a sample of their paintings from that period:

- Ho Kan, 1967
- Hsia Yan, 1965
- Hsiao Chin, 1955

=== Redevelopment (mid-1980s – 1990s) ===
==== Contemporary art ====
Contemporary Chinese art (Chinese: 中國當代藝術; pinyin: Zhongguo Dangdai Yishu) often referred to as Chinese avant-garde art, continued to develop since the 1980s as an outgrowth of modern art developments post-Cultural Revolution.

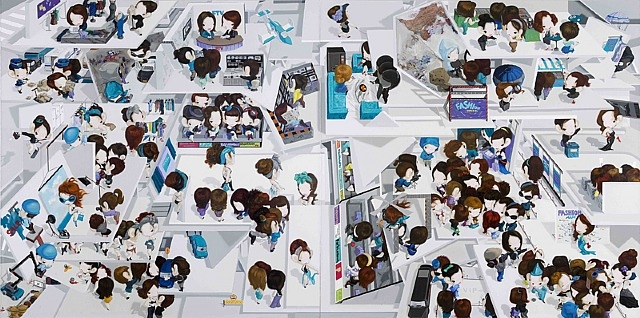
Han Yajuan: Fashion Ensemble. Oil on canvas, 2010 (180 cm × 360 cm).

Contemporary Chinese art fully incorporates painting, film, video, photography, and performance. Until recently, art exhibitions deemed controversial have been routinely shut down by police, and performance artists in particular faced the threat of arrest in the early 1990s. More recently there has been greater tolerance by the Chinese government, though many internationally acclaimed artists are still restricted from media exposure at home or have exhibitions ordered closed. Leading contemporary visual artists include Ai Weiwei, Cai Guoqiang, Cai Jin, Chan Shengyao, Concept 21, Ding Yi, Fang Lijun, Fu Wenjun, He Xiangyu, Huang Yan, Huang Yong Ping, Han Yajuan, Kong Bai Ji, Li Hongbo, Li Hui, Liu Bolin, Lu Shengzhong, Ma Liuming, Qiu Deshu, Qiu Shihua, Shen Fan, Shen Shaomin, Shi Jinsong, Song Dong, Li Wei, Wang Guangyi, Wenda Gu, Xu Bing, Yang Zhichao, Zhan Wang, Zheng Lianjie, Zhang Dali, Zhang Xiaogang, Zhang Huan, Zhu Yu, Wu Shaoxiang, Ma Kelu, Ding Fang, Shang Yang, Gao Minglu, and Guo Jian.

==== Visual art ====
Beginning in the late 1980s, there was unprecedented exposure for younger Chinese visual artists in the west to some degree through the agency of curators based outside the country such as Hou Hanru. Local curators within the country such as Gao Minglu and critics such as Li Xianting reinforced this promotion of particular brands of painting that had recently emerged, while also spreading the idea of art as a strong social force within Chinese culture. There was some controversy as critics identified these imprecise representations of contemporary Chinese art as having been constructed out of personal preferences, a kind of programmatized artist-curator relationship that only further alienated the majority of the avant-garde from Chinese officialdom and western art market patronage.

== Chinoiserie ==
Chinoiserie is the European interpretation and imitation of Chinese and East Asian artistic traditions, especially in the decorative arts, garden design, architecture, literature, theatre, and music. The aesthetic of Chinoiserie has been expressed in different ways depending on the region. It is related to the broader current of Orientalism, which studied Far East cultures from a historical, philological, anthropological, philosophical, and religious point of view. First appearing in the 17th century, this trend was popularized in the 18th century due to the rise in trade with China and East Asia.

As a style, chinoiserie is related to the rococo style. Both styles are characterized by exuberant decoration, asymmetry, a focus on materials, and stylized nature and subject matter that focuses on leisure and pleasure. Chinoiserie focuses on subjects that were thought by colonial-era Europeans to be typical of Chinese culture.

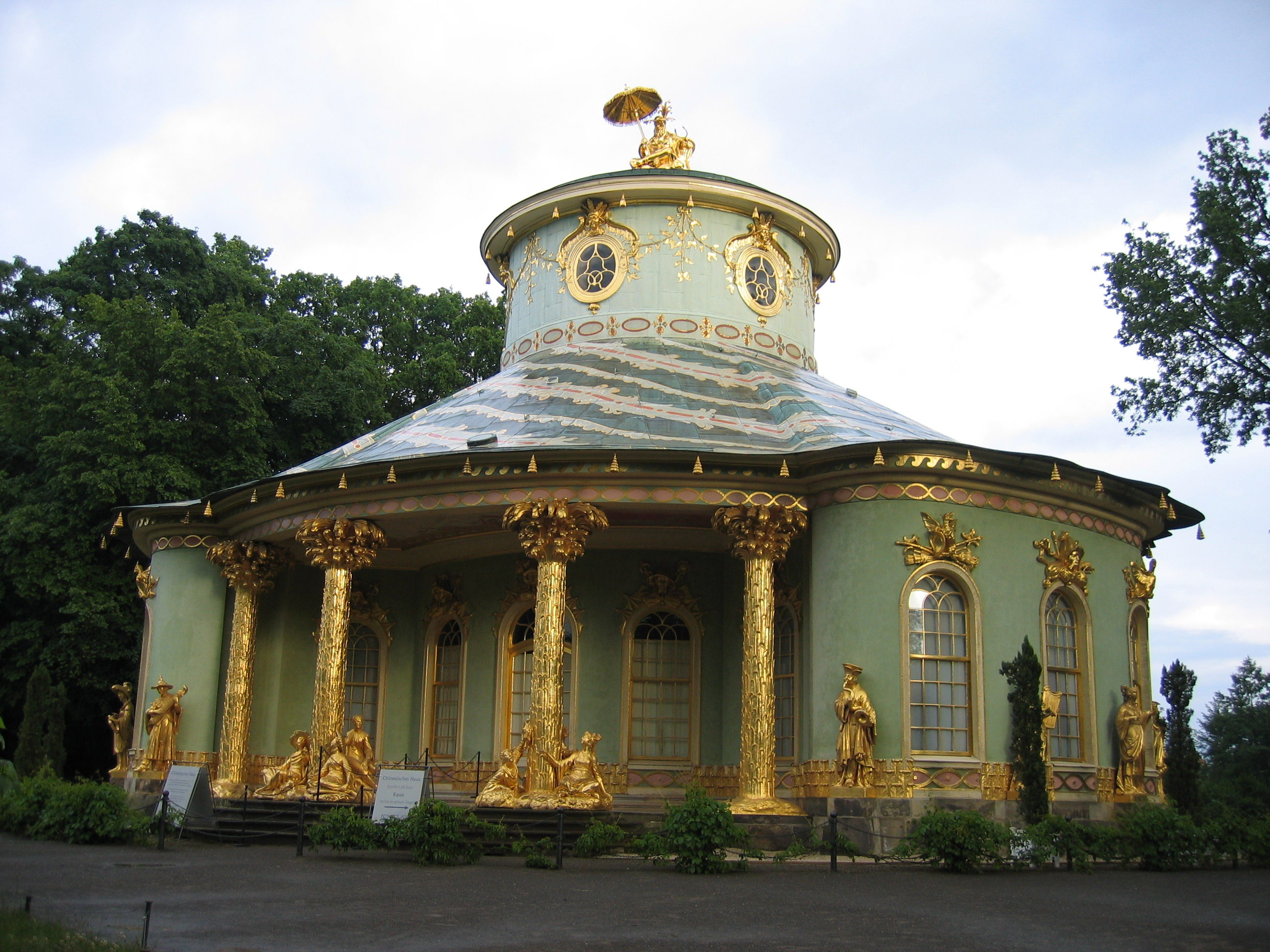
The Chinese House, a chinoiserie garden pavilion in Sanssouci Park, from Potsdam, Germany

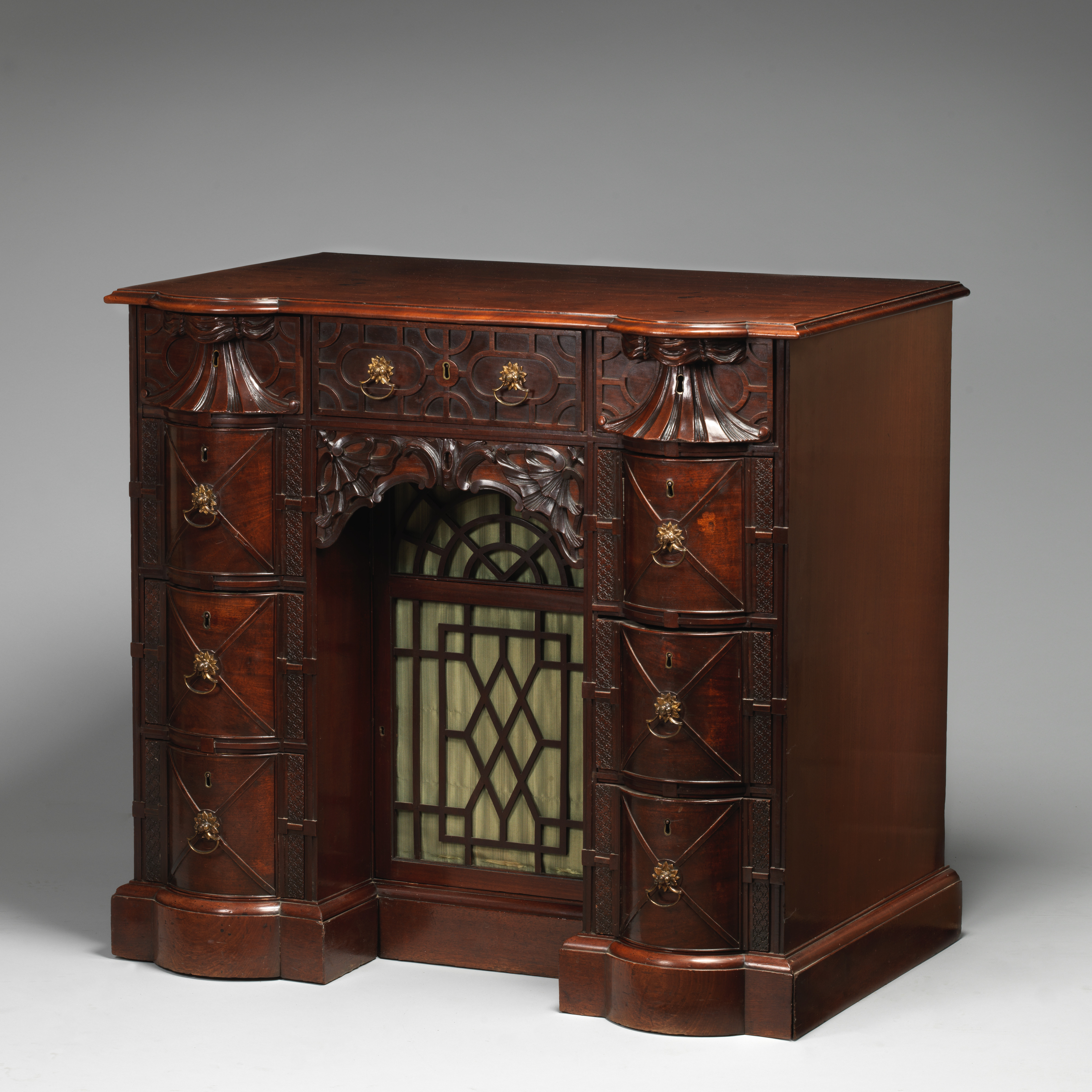
Kneehole writing table; circa 1760; mahogany, mahogany veneer and gilt bronze; 88.9 × 97.8 × 62.2 cm; Metropolitan Museum of Art (New York City)

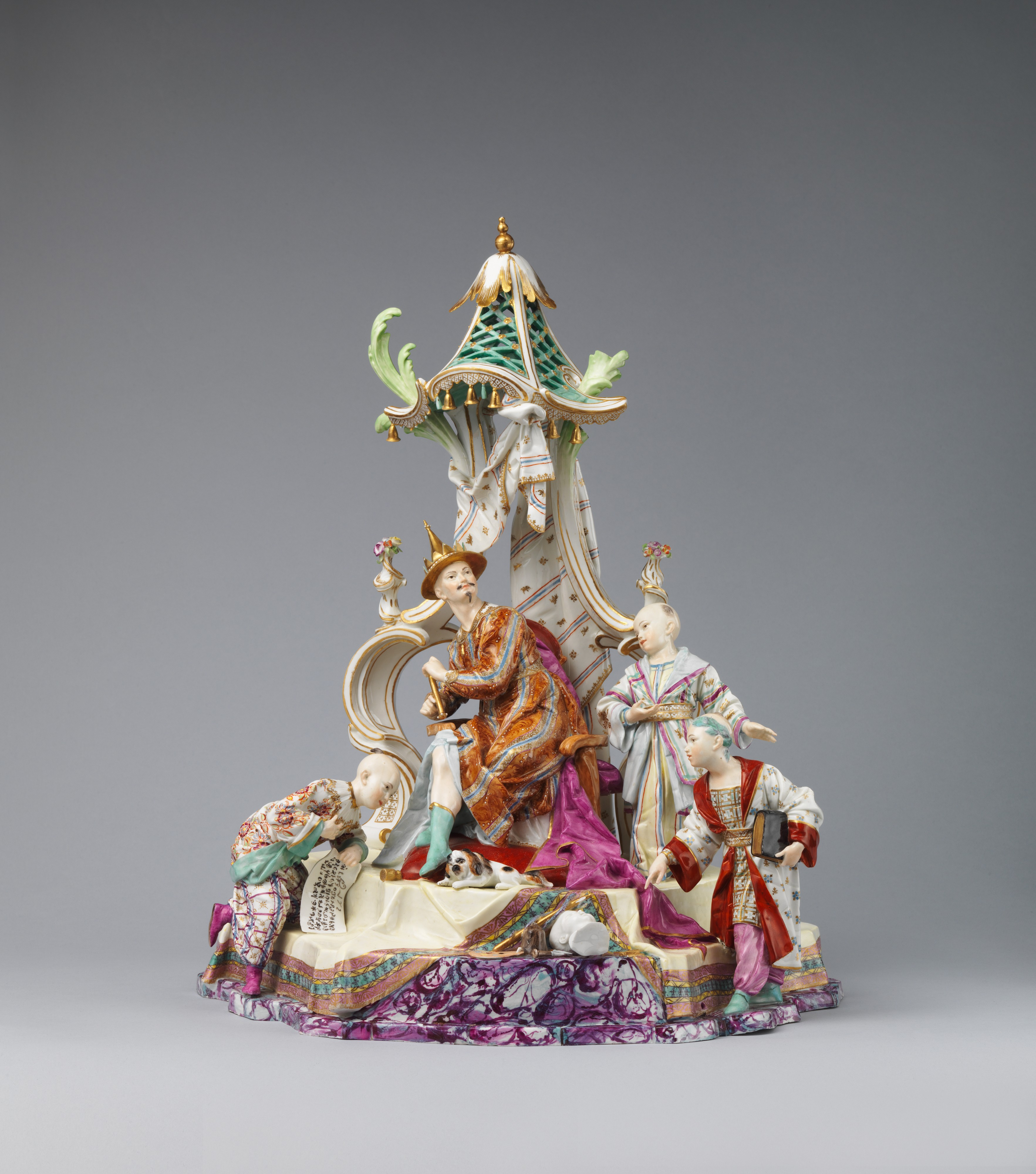
Audience of the Chinese Emperor; 1766; hard-paste porcelain; overall: 39.8 × 33.2 × 21.7 cm; Metropolitan Museum of Art

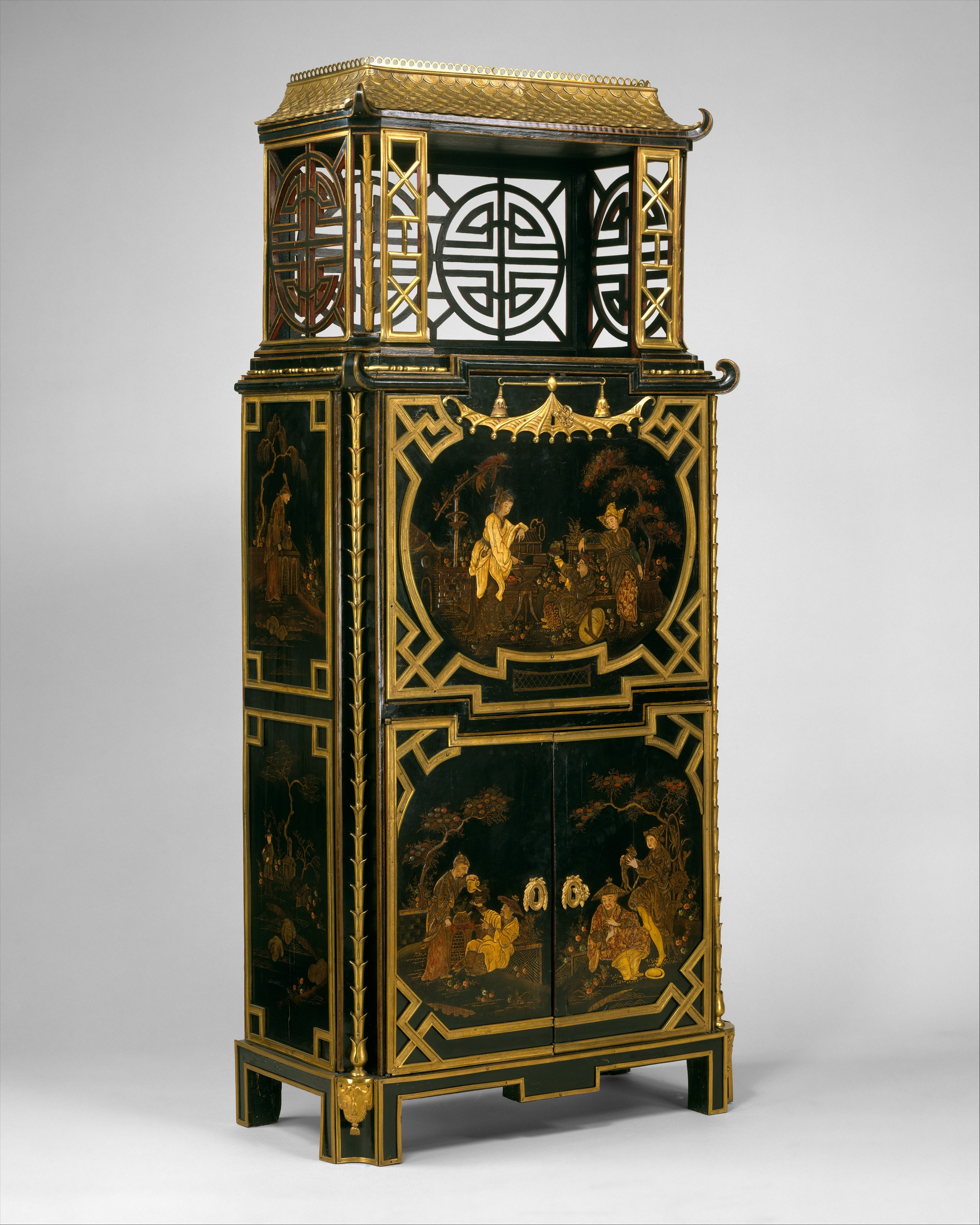
Drop-front secretaire (secrètaire à abattant); 1770–1775; painted and varnished oak, mahogany, purplewood and gilt-bronze mounts; 152.4 × 67.9 × 34 cm; Metropolitan Museum of Art

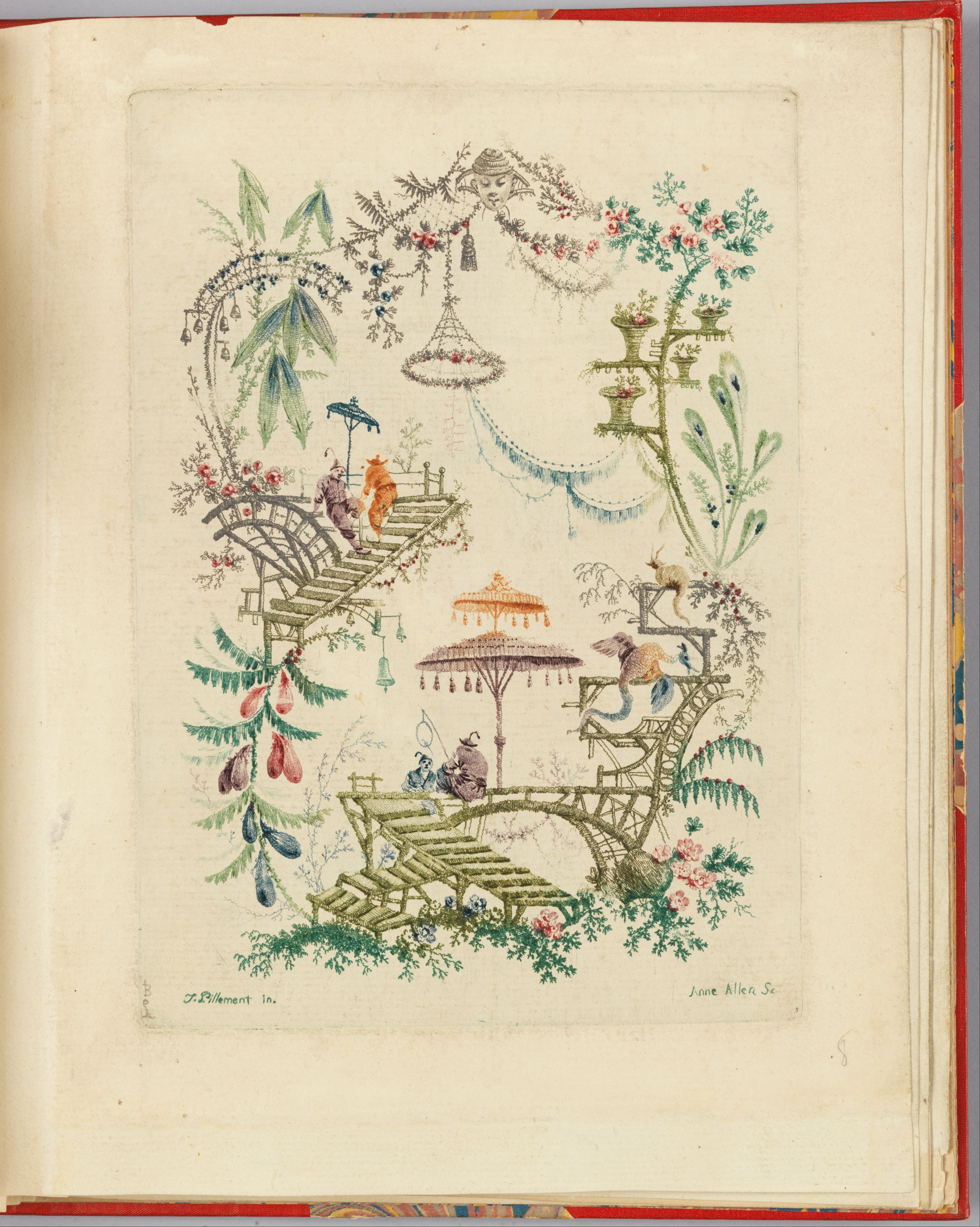
Ornamental Design from "Nouvelle suite de cahiers chinois a l'usage des Dessinateurs et des peintres"; after 1775; etching with colored inks à la poupé on off-white laid paper; Cooper Hewitt, Smithsonian Design Museum

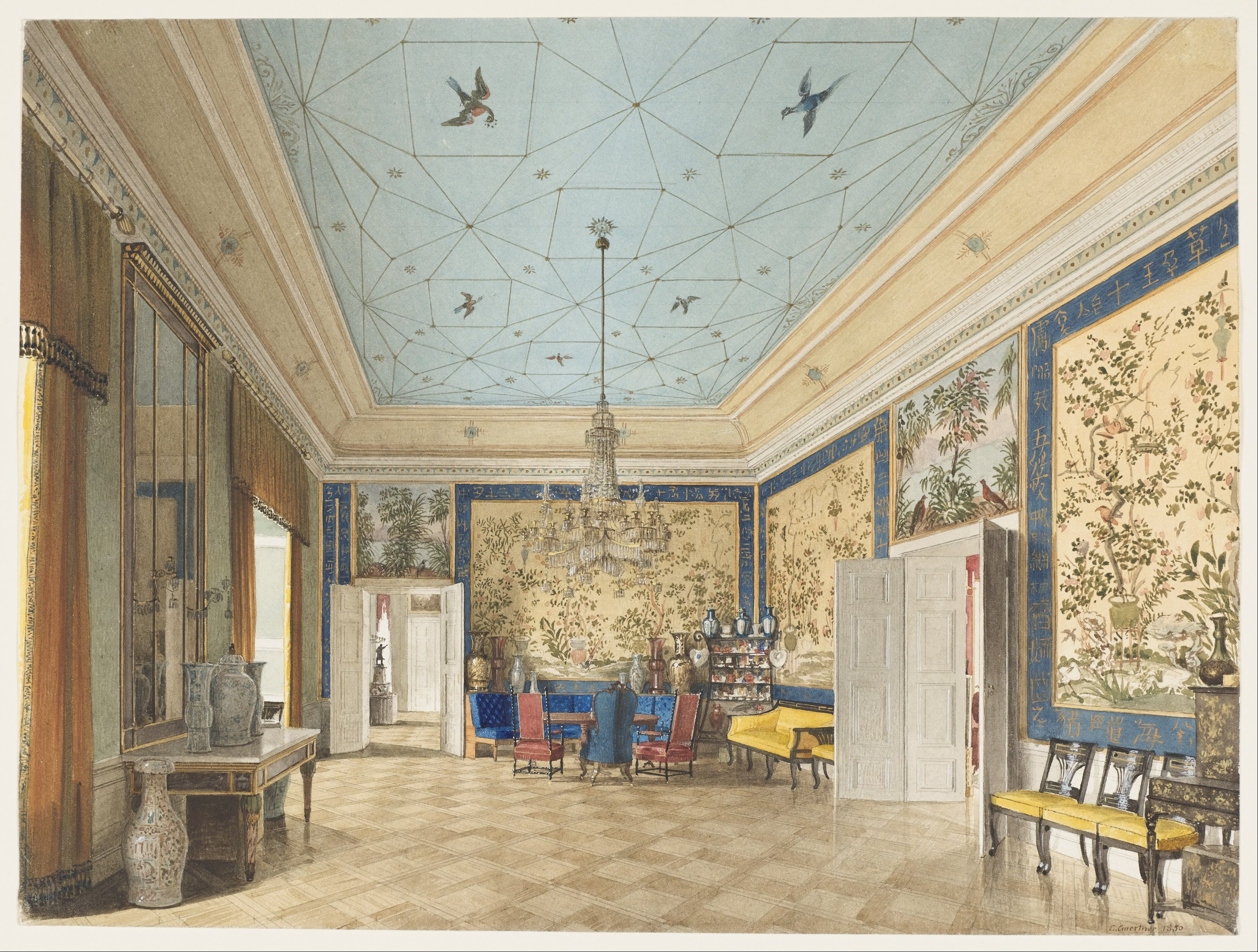
The Chinese Room in the Royal Palace (Berlin); 1850; brush and watercolor and gouache, graphite on white wove paper; Cooper Hewitt, Smithsonian Design Museum

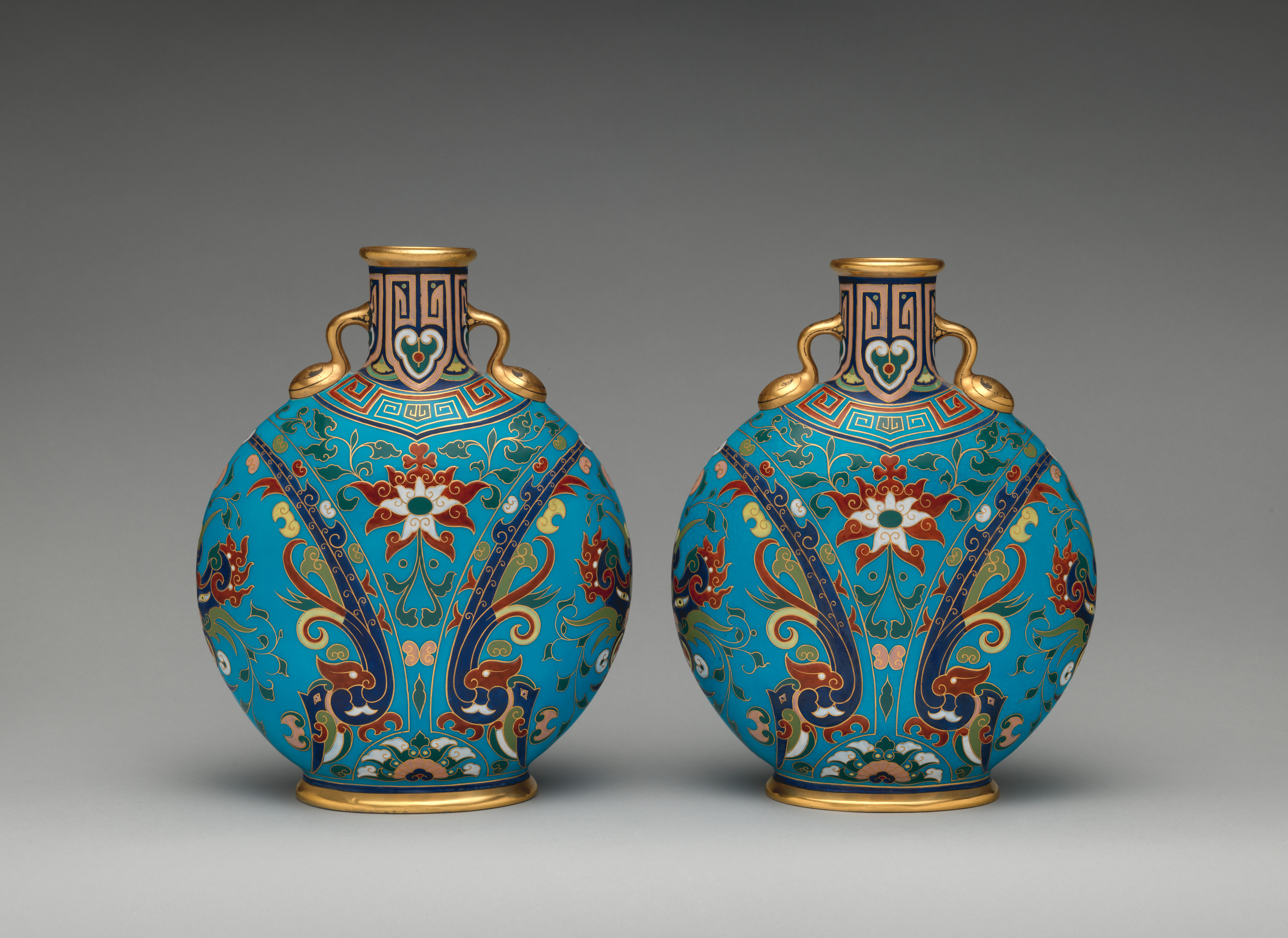
Pair of round and flat bodied bottles; 1870–1880; porcelain; first bottle: 26.4 × 21 × 10.6 cm, second bottle: 25.7 × 20.2 × 10.2 cm; Metropolitan Museum of Art

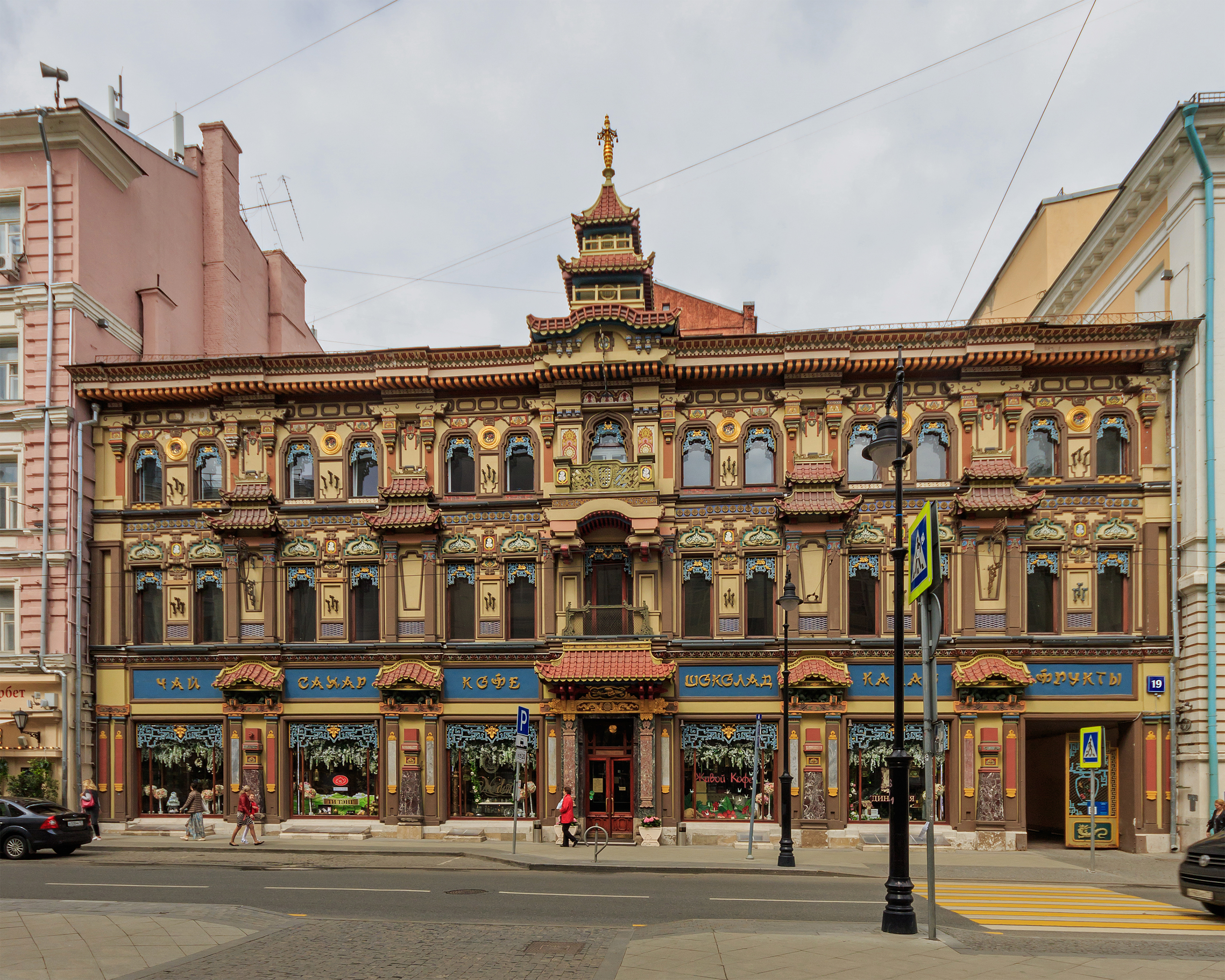
The Tea House at Myasnitskaya Street in Moscow (Russia)

Hard-paste porcelain teapot with enamel decoration, made at Plymouth, England, c. 1770, height 17.1 cm. Metropolitan Museum of Art

Delftware spice pot with chinoiserie decoration, De Grieksche A factory, Delft, c. 1680–1685. Rijksmuseum, Amsterdam

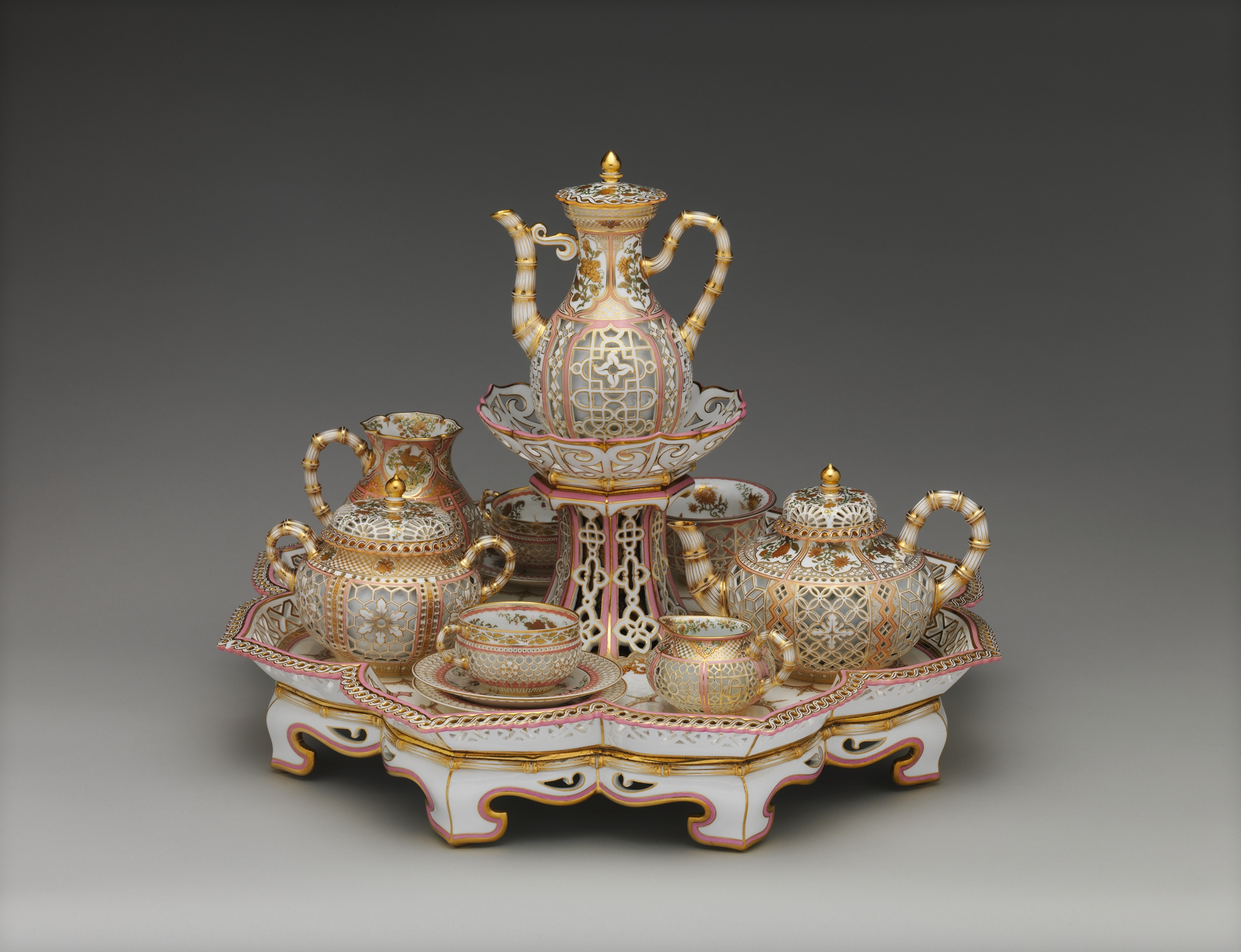
Sèvres coffee and tea service (déjeuner chinois réticulé), France, 1855–1861. Metropolitan Museum of Art

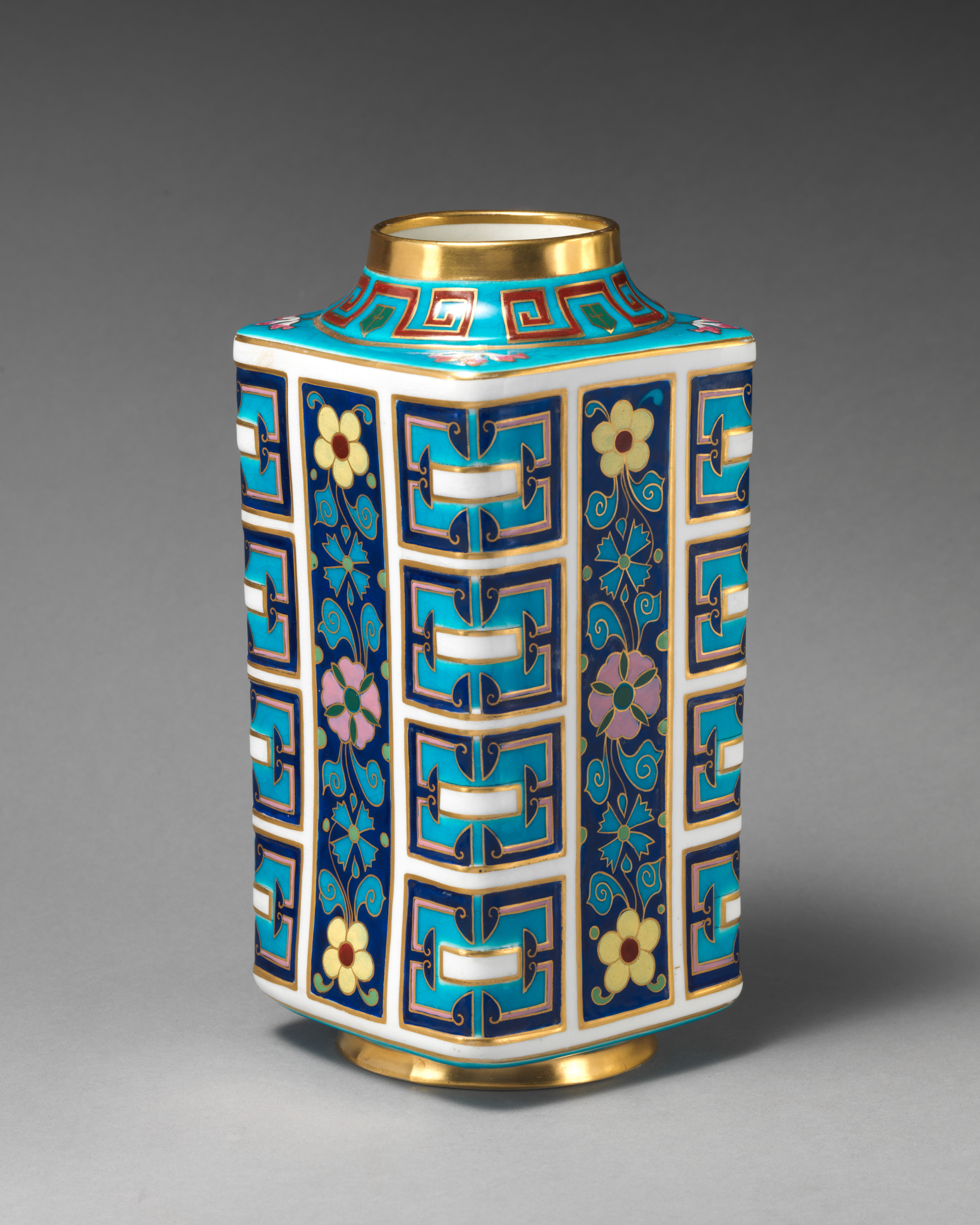
Cuboid vase, bone china, made by Minton, Stoke-on-Trent, Staffordshire, 1870. Metropolitan Museum of Art

== Art market ==
All The Mountains Blanketed in Red by Li Keran

Today, the market for Chinese art, both antique and contemporary, is widely reported to be among the hottest and fastest-growing in the world, attracting buyers all over the world. The Voice of America reported in 2006 that modern Chinese art is raking in record prices both internationally and in domestic markets, some experts even fearing the market might be overheating. The Economist reported that Chinese art has become the latest darling in the world market according to the record sales from Sotheby's and Christie's, the biggest fine-art auction houses.

Contemporary Chinese art saw record sales throughout the 2000s. In 2007, it was estimated that 5 of the world's 10 best selling living artists at art auction were from China, with artists such as Zhang Xiaogang whose works were sold for a total of $56.8 million at auction in 2007. In terms of buying-market, China overtook France in the late 2000s as the world's third-largest art market, after the United States and the United Kingdom, due to the growing middle-class in the country. Sotheby's noted that contemporary Chinese art has rapidly changed the contemporary Asian art world into one of the most dynamic sectors on the international art market. During the global economic crisis, the contemporary Asian art market and the contemporary Chinese art market experienced a slow down in late 2008. The market for Contemporary Chinese and Asian art saw a major revival in late 2009 with record level sales at Christie's.

For centuries largely made-up of European and American buyers, the international buying market for Chinese art has also begun to be dominated by Chinese dealers and collectors in recent years. It was reported in 2011, China has become the world's second biggest market for art and antiques, accounting for 23 percent of the world's total art market, behind the United States (which accounts for 34 percent of the world's art market). Another transformation driving the growth of the Chinese art market is the rise of a clientele no longer mostly European or American. New fortunes from countries once thought of as poor often prefer non-Western art; a large gallerist in the field has offices in both New York and Beijing, but clients mainly hailing from Latin America, Asia and the Middle East.

One of the areas that has revived art concentration and also commercialized the industry is the 798 Art District in Dashanzi of Beijing. The artist Zhang Xiaogang sold a 1993 painting for US$2.3 million in 2006, which included blank faced Chinese families from the Cultural Revolution era, while Yue Minjun's work Execution in 2007 was sold for a then record of nearly $6 million at Sotheby's. Collectors including Stanley Ho, the owner of the Macau Casinos, investment manager Christopher Tsai, and casino developer Steve Wynn, would capitalize on the art trends. Items such as Ming dynasty vases and assorted Imperial pieces were auctioned off.

Other art works were sold in places such as Christie's including a Chinese porcelain piece with the mark of the Qianlong Emperor sold for HKD $ $151.3 million. Sotheby's and Christie's act as major market platforms for classical Chinese porcelain art pieces to be sold, including Ming dynasty, Xuande mark and period (1426–35) Blue and White jar (Five-Clawed Dragon Print), which was auctioned for Approx. USD 19,224,491.2, through Christie's in Spring 2016 The International Herald Tribune reported that Chinese porcelains were fought over in the art market as "if there was no tomorrow".

A 1964 painting by Li Keran "All the Mountains Blanketed in Red" was sold for HKD $35 million. Auctions were also held at Sotheby's where Xu Beihong's 1939 masterpiece "Put Down Your Whip" sold for HKD $72 million. The industry is not limited to fine arts, as many other types of contemporary pieces were also sold. In 2000, a number of Chinese artists were included in Documenta and the Venice Biennale of 2003. China now has its own major contemporary art showcase with the Venice Biennale. Fuck Off was a notorious art exhibition which ran alongside the Shanghai Biennial Festival in 2000 and was curated by independent curator Feng Boyi and contemporary artist Ai Weiwei.

== Notable museums ==
=== Greater China ===
==== Public ====
- Palace Museum
- National Palace Museum
- National Museum of China
- Shanghai Museum
- Liaoning Provincial Museum
- Hunan Museum
- Nanjing Museum
- Shanxi Museum
- Sanxingdui Museum
- Suzhou Museum
- Hong Kong Palace Museum
- National Art Museum of China

==== Private ====
- Guanfu Museum
- Long Museum
- Liang Yi Museum
- Aurora Art Museum

=== International ===
- British Museum
- Victoria and Albert Museum
- Musée Guimet
- Metropolitan Museum of Art
- Museum of Fine Arts, Boston
- Cleveland Museum of Art
- Nelson-Atkins Museum of Art
- Minneapolis Institute of Art
- Art Institute of Chicago
- National Museum of Asian Art
- Harvard Art Museums
- Penn Museum
- Princeton University Art Museum
- Topkapi Palace
- Museum of East Asian Art, Bath
- Tokyo National Museum
- Nara National Museum
- Museum of Oriental Ceramics, Osaka
- Osaka City Museum of Fine Arts
- Nezu Museum
- Sen-oku Hakuko Kan
- Seikadō Bunko Art Museum

== See also ==
- 798 Art Zone
- Chinese fine art
  - Chinese ceramics
  - Chinese painting
  - Chinese sculpture
  - Chinese jade
  - Chinese papercut
  - Chinese calligraphy
- Performance art in China
- Chinese dance
- Chinese opera
- Chinese drama
- Chinese folk art
- Eastern art history
- History of China
  - Four Olds
- List of Chinese cultural relics forbidden to be exhibited abroad
- List of Chinese women artists
- Fruit pit carving
- Tian-tsui
- Jue
- Jian
- Oil paper umbrella
- Wuxia

== Additional sources ==
- Edmund Capon and Mae Anna Pang, Chinese Paintings of the Ming and Qing Dynasties, Catalogue, 1981, International Cultural Corporation of Australia Ltd.
- Rawson, Jessica (ed). The British Museum Book of Chinese Art, 2007 (2nd edn), British Museum Press, ISBN 978-0-7141-2446-9
- Sickman, Laurence, in: Sickman L. & Soper A., The Art and Architecture of China, Pelican History of Art, 3rd ed 1971, Penguin (now Yale History of Art), LOC 70–125675
- MSN Encarta (Archived 2009-10-31)
- The Columbia Electronic Encyclopedia
- SHiNE Art Space Gallery
