= Chu Tat-shing =

Chinese sculptor

Chu Tat-shing MH
- 朱達誠
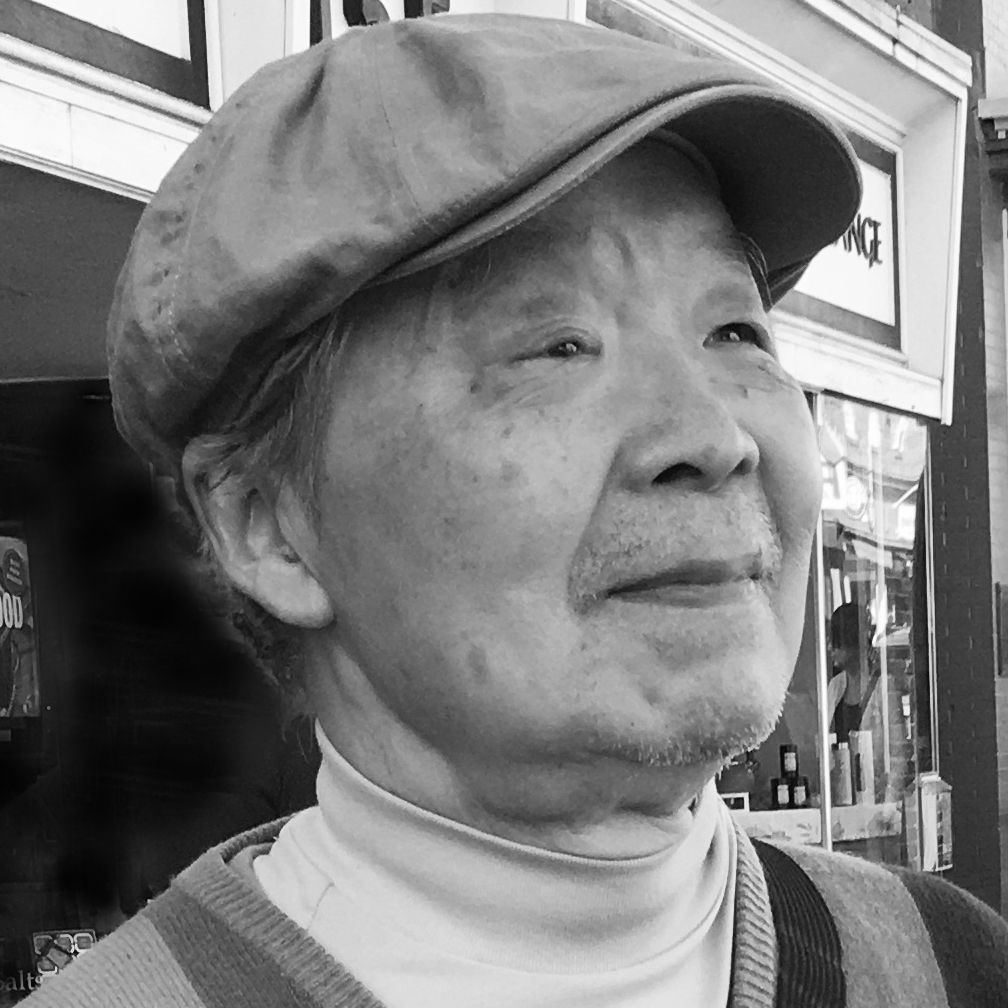
- Chu Tat-shing in 2022

Chu Tat-shing (Chinese: 朱達誠; born 1942) is a Chinese sculptor and visual artist. He is known for his sculpture of Bruce Lee at the Hong Kong Heritage Museum. He has also made sculptures of Sun Yat-sen on display in Hong Kong and Hawaii. The sculptures at the SARS Memorial in Hong Kong Park were made by him.

== Background ==
Chu Tat-shing was born in Wuhan, China. He graduated from the Department of Sculpture of the Hubei Institute of Fine Arts in Wuhan in 1965. In 1978, he began graduate work at the Department of Sculpture of the Central Academy of Fine Arts in Beijing. After completing his work there, he returned to the Hubei Institute of Fine Arts where he became head of the sculpture art studio. He migrated to Hong Kong in 1984, where he is a member of the Hong Kong Sculpture Society. He has also served on the Board of Directors of the Hong Kong Artists Association, and as the Chairman of the Board of the Artist Commune. He has taught for the University of Hong Kong and for the Chinese University of Hong Kong in their extramural programs. He has also helped lead the China Artists Association, the Beijing Artists Association, and the China Sculpture Institute. He has also instructed a workshop for the Hong Kong Museum of Art.

He has made sculptures for HongKong Land, the Hong Kong University of Science and Technology, and the Chinese University of Hong Kong.

== Awards ==
In 2007, the government of Hong Kong awarded Chu the Medal of Honour.

== Bruce Lee ==
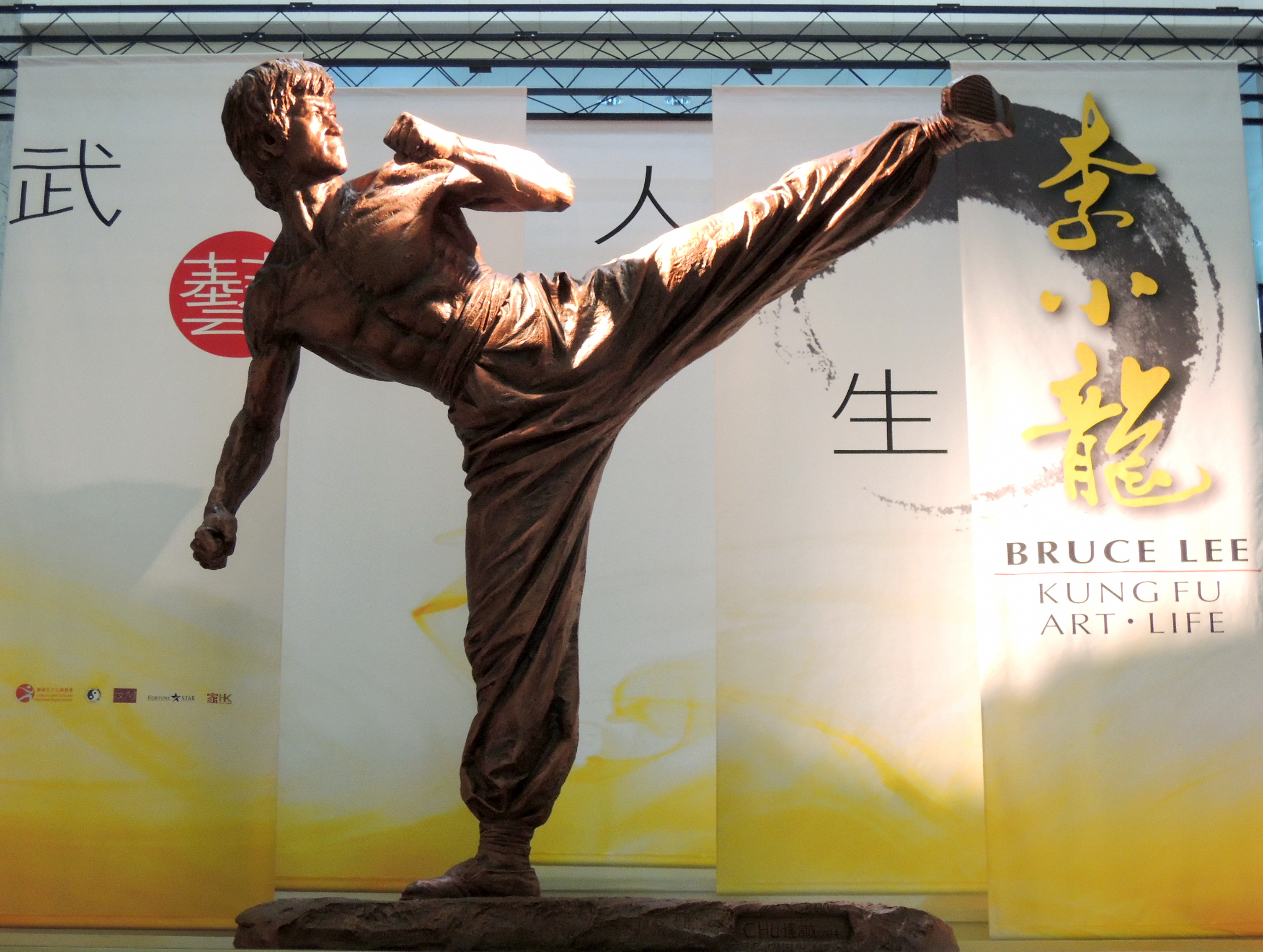
Bruce Lee at the Hong Kong Heritage Museum

In 2013, Chu's 3.5 meter sculpture of Bruce Lee in a side-kick pose was put on display at the Hong Kong Heritage Museum as part of the Exhibition "Bruce Lee: Kung Fu . Art . Life". Originally displayed inside, it now stands outside the entrance.

A documentary about making and installing this piece is called: "Behind-The-Scene: Bruce Lee Sculpture".

A peer-reviewed journal article about this statue was published in Chinese Semiotic Studies in 2022.

== Sun Yat-sen ==
In 2006, a statue of Sun Yat-sen as a young man by Chu was unveiled at the Dr. Sun Yat-sen Museum in Hong Kong.

In 2007, the city of Honolulu, Hawaii, renamed "Chinatown Gateway Park" to "Dr. Sun Yat-sen Memorial Park" and dedicated a statue of Sun Yat-sen at age 13, made by Chu. The pose has one hand holding books and the other touching them. This park was reopened after renovations in 2022. The statue of Sun Yat-sen was moved to the center of the park.

A second statue by Chu of Sun Yat-sen as a 13-year-old is at the ʻIolani School in Hawaii. The pose has one hand holding books and the other at his side. This sculpture is featured in a video made by the school.

Both statues are described in an article by the Dr. Sun Yat-sen Foundation of Hawaii.

In 2010, the Sun Yat-sen Memorial Park in Hong Kong, having completed renovations, reopened featuring another statue of Sun Yat-sen by Chu. In a video interview Chu talks about his sculpture in the Sun Yat-sen Memorial Park (Starts at 2:16).

Another Sun Yat-sen sculpture stands in the Zhongshan Warship Museum in Wuhan, China.

In 2022, Chu gave a lecture about Sun Yat-sen at the Hong Kong Baptist University.

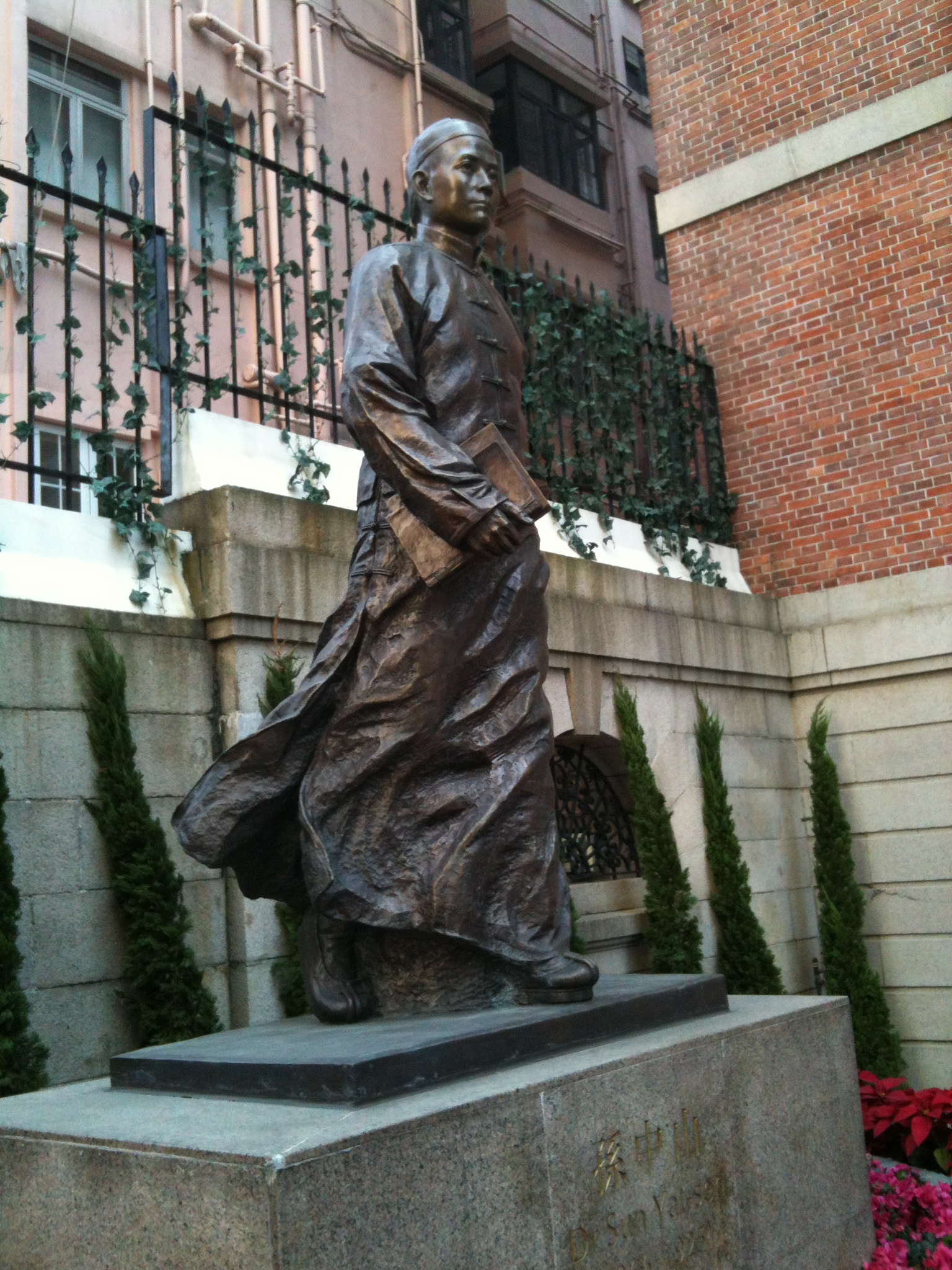

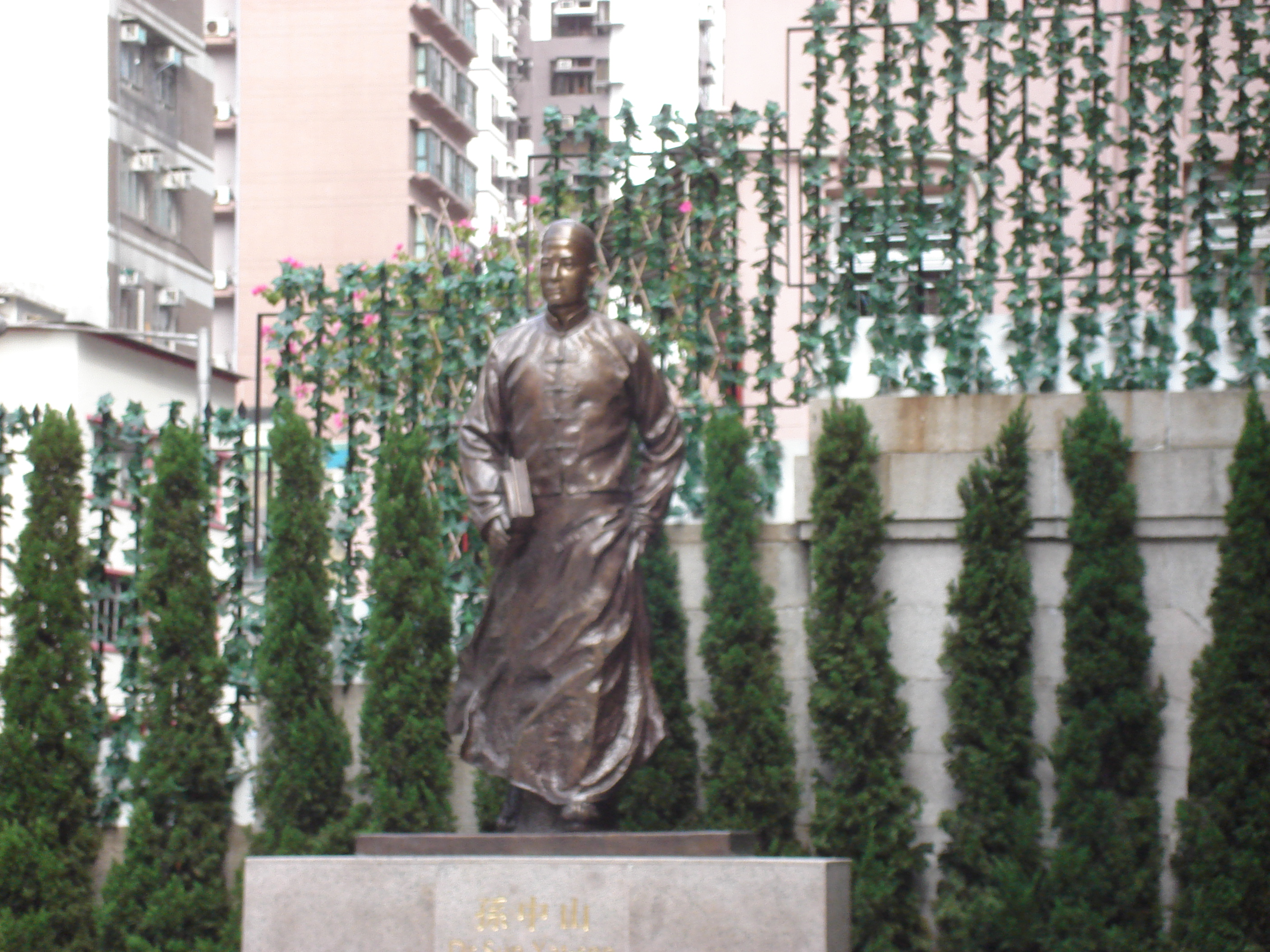
Sun Yat-sen at the Dr. Sun Yat-sen Museum in Hong Kong.

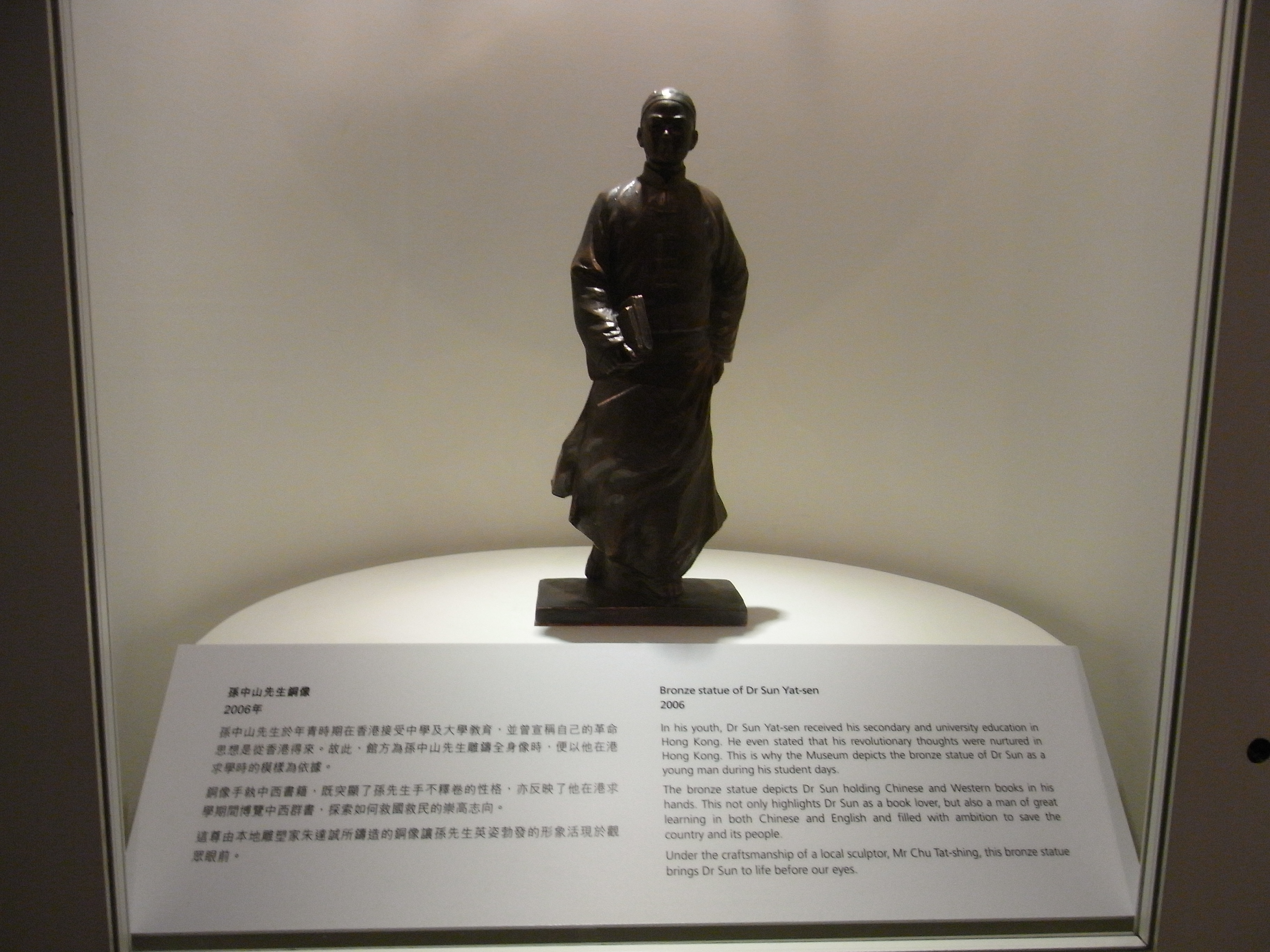
Sun Yat-sen at the Dr. Sun Yat-sen Museum in Hong Kong.

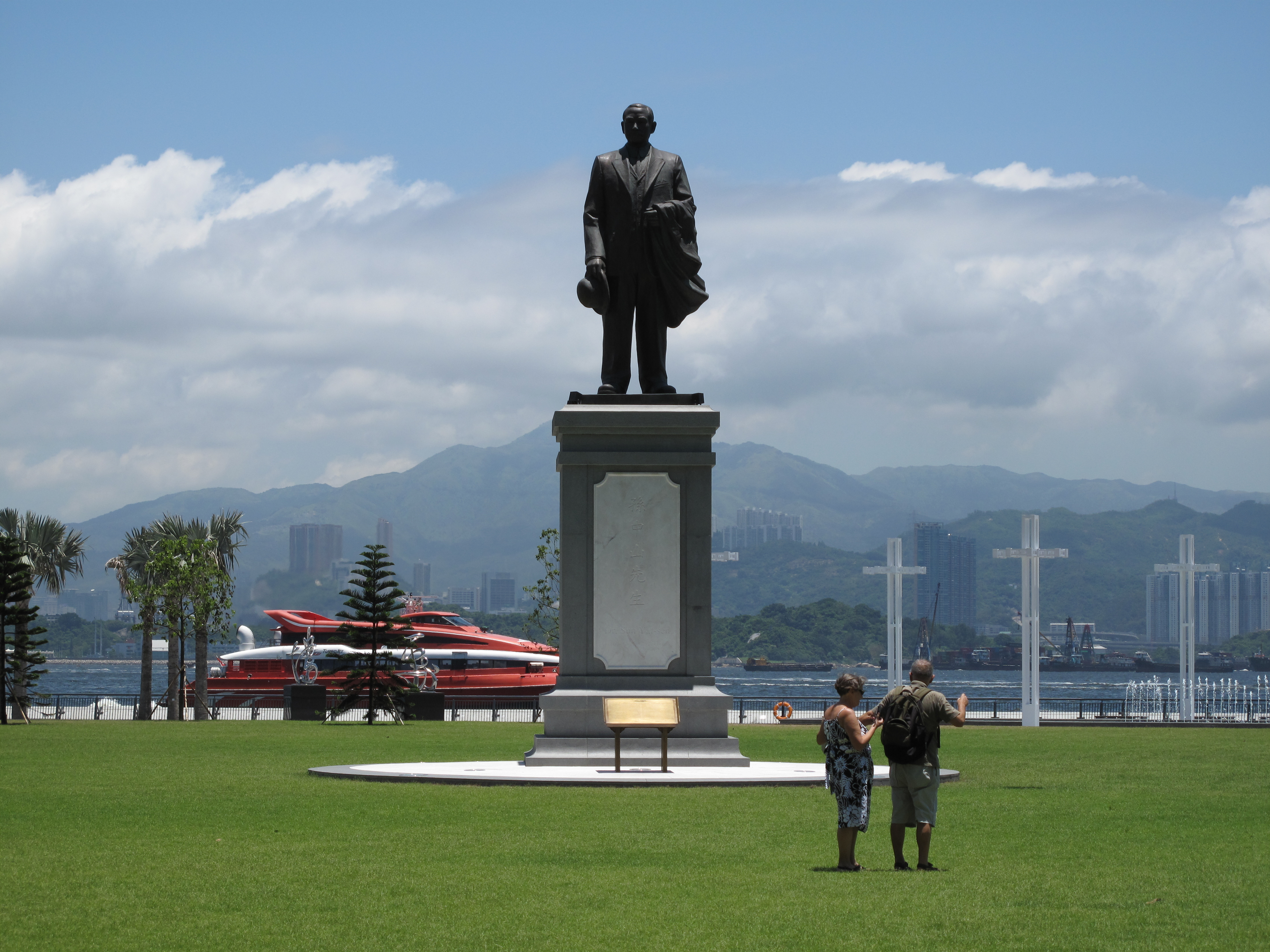
Sun Yat-sen at Sun Yat-sen Memorial Park in Hong Kong.

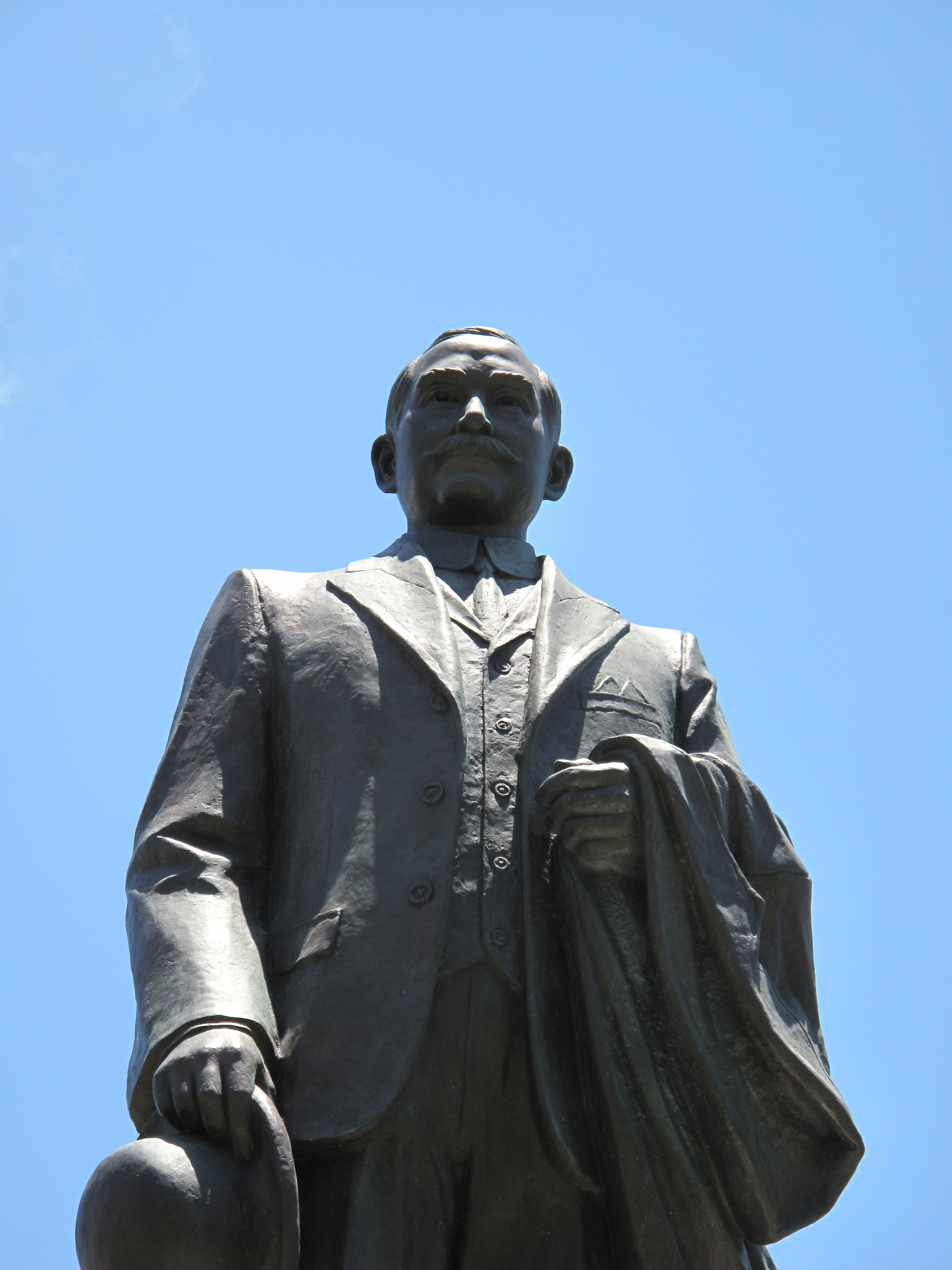
Sun Yat-sen at the Sun Yat-sen Memorial Park in Hong Kong

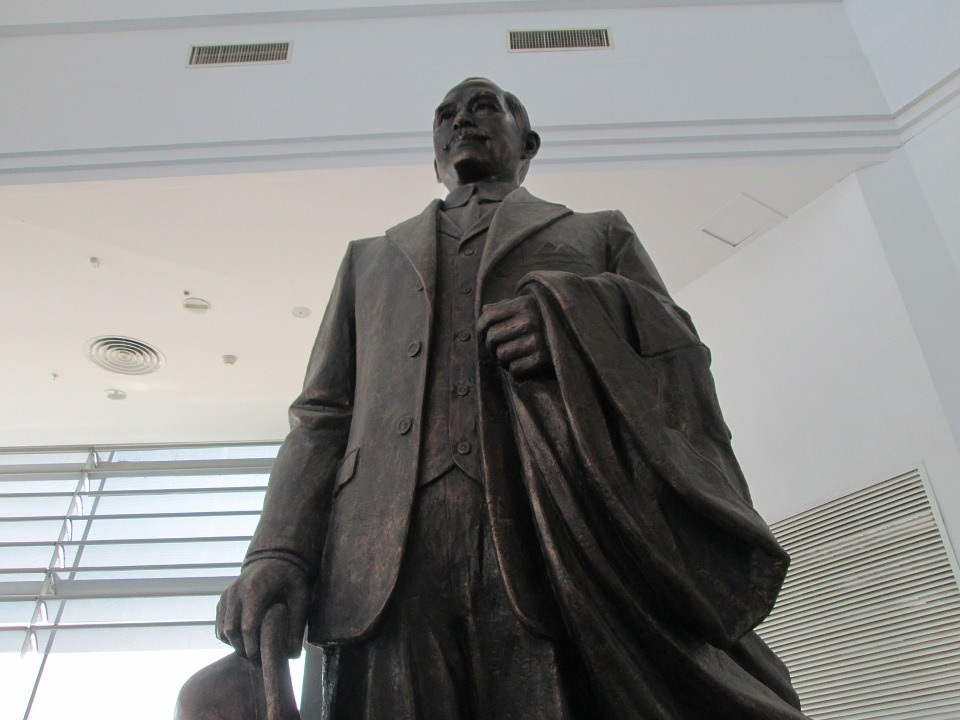
Sun Yat-sen at the Zhongshan Warship Museum in Wuhan, China

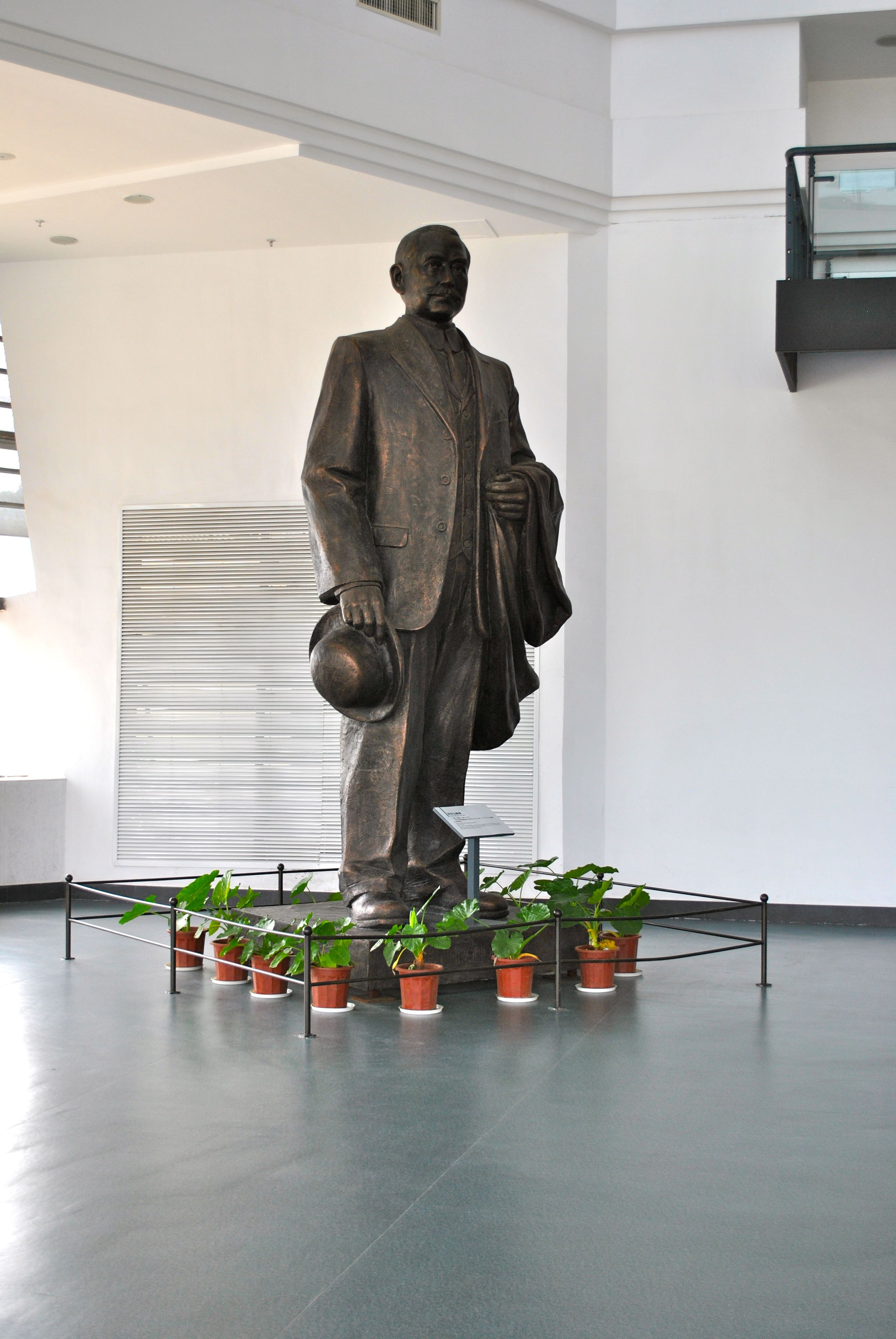
Sun Yat-sen at the Zhongshan Warship Museum in Wuhan

== Calligraphy sculptures ==
Chu has made several sculptures based on Chinese Calligraphy. The sculpture "Home" is outside the Ho Tim Hall of the Chinese University of Hong Kong. A smaller version was included in an exhibition at the National Museum of China.

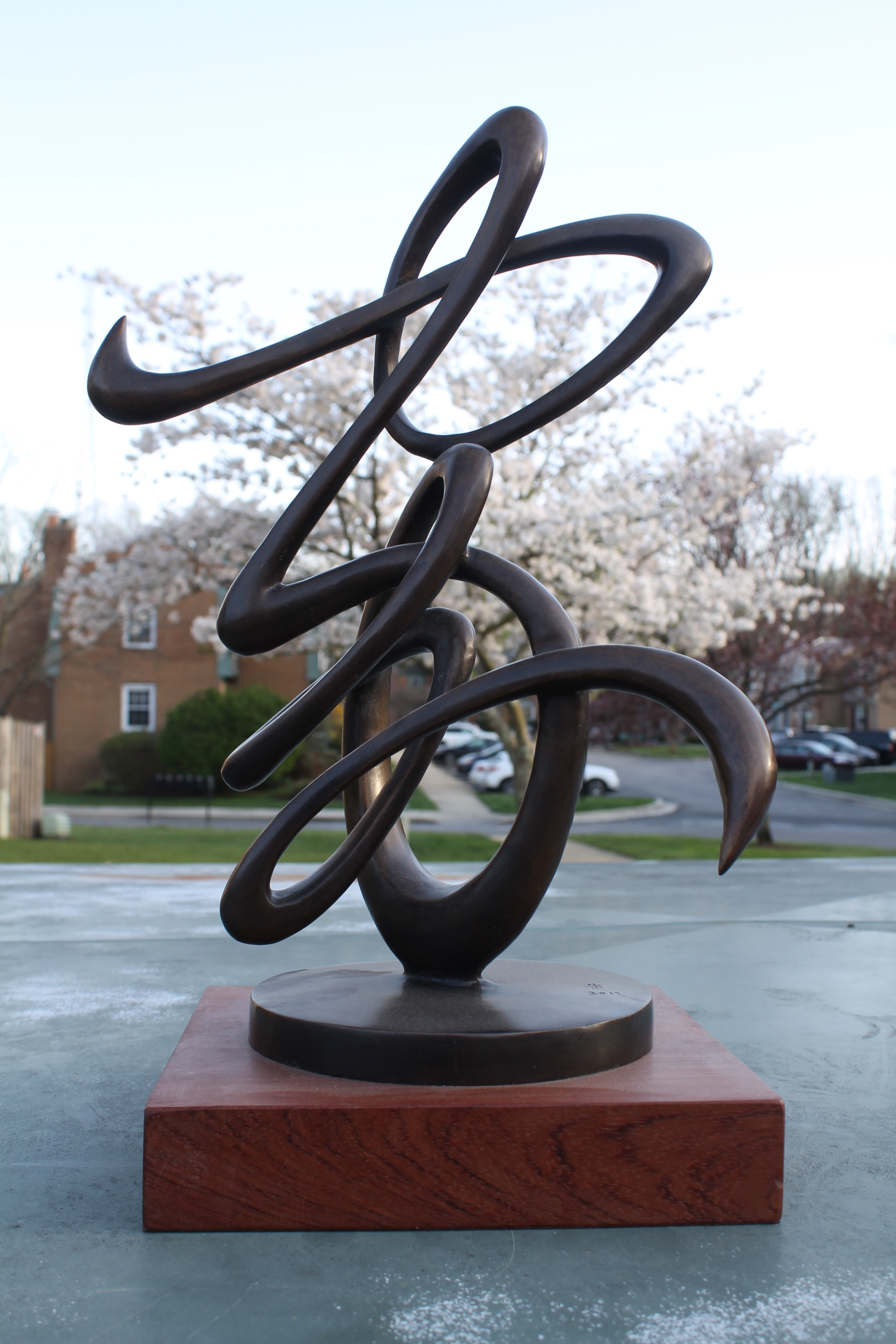
Home (smaller version)

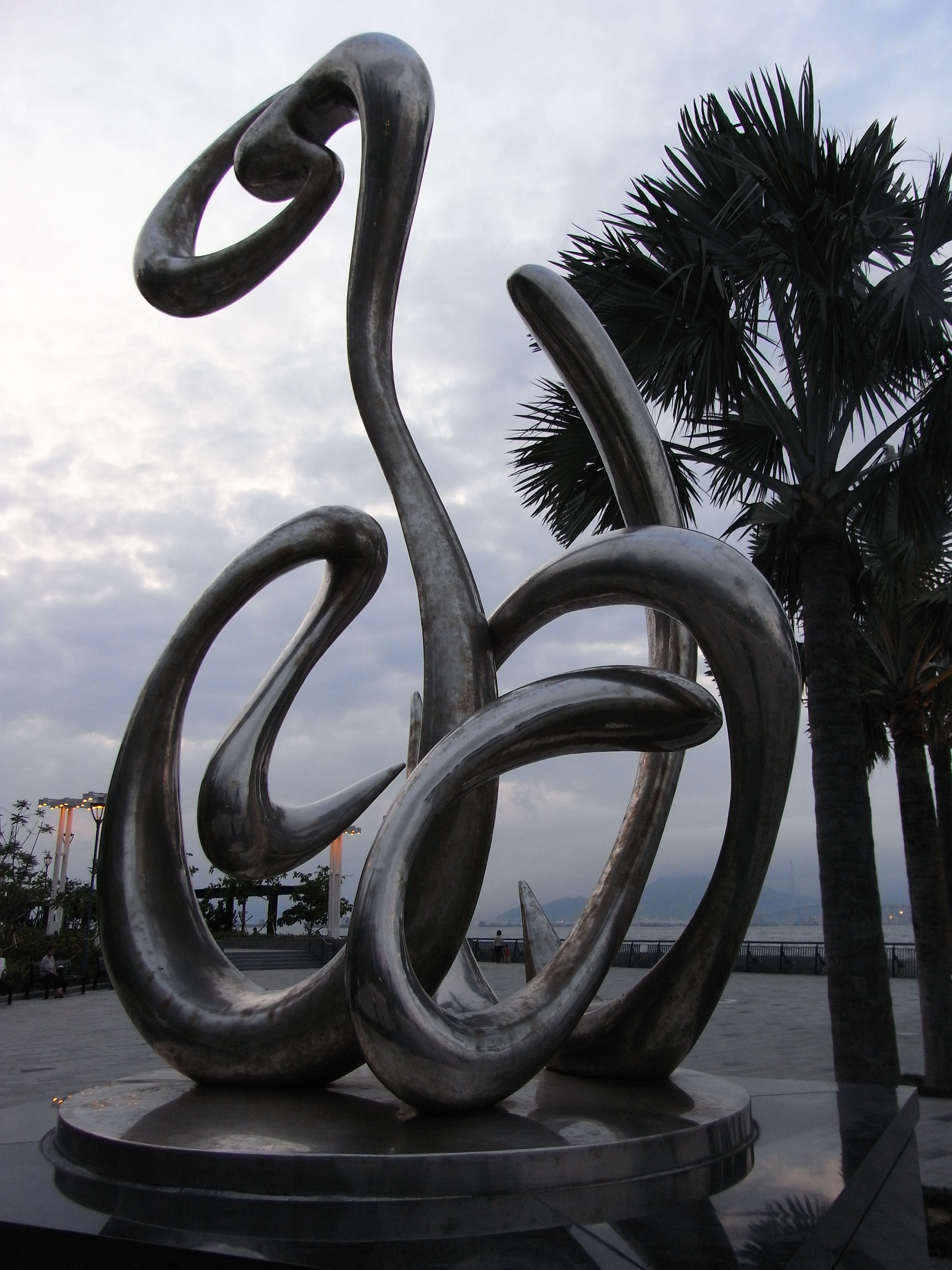
Freedom at the Sun Yat-sen Memorial Park in Hong Kong

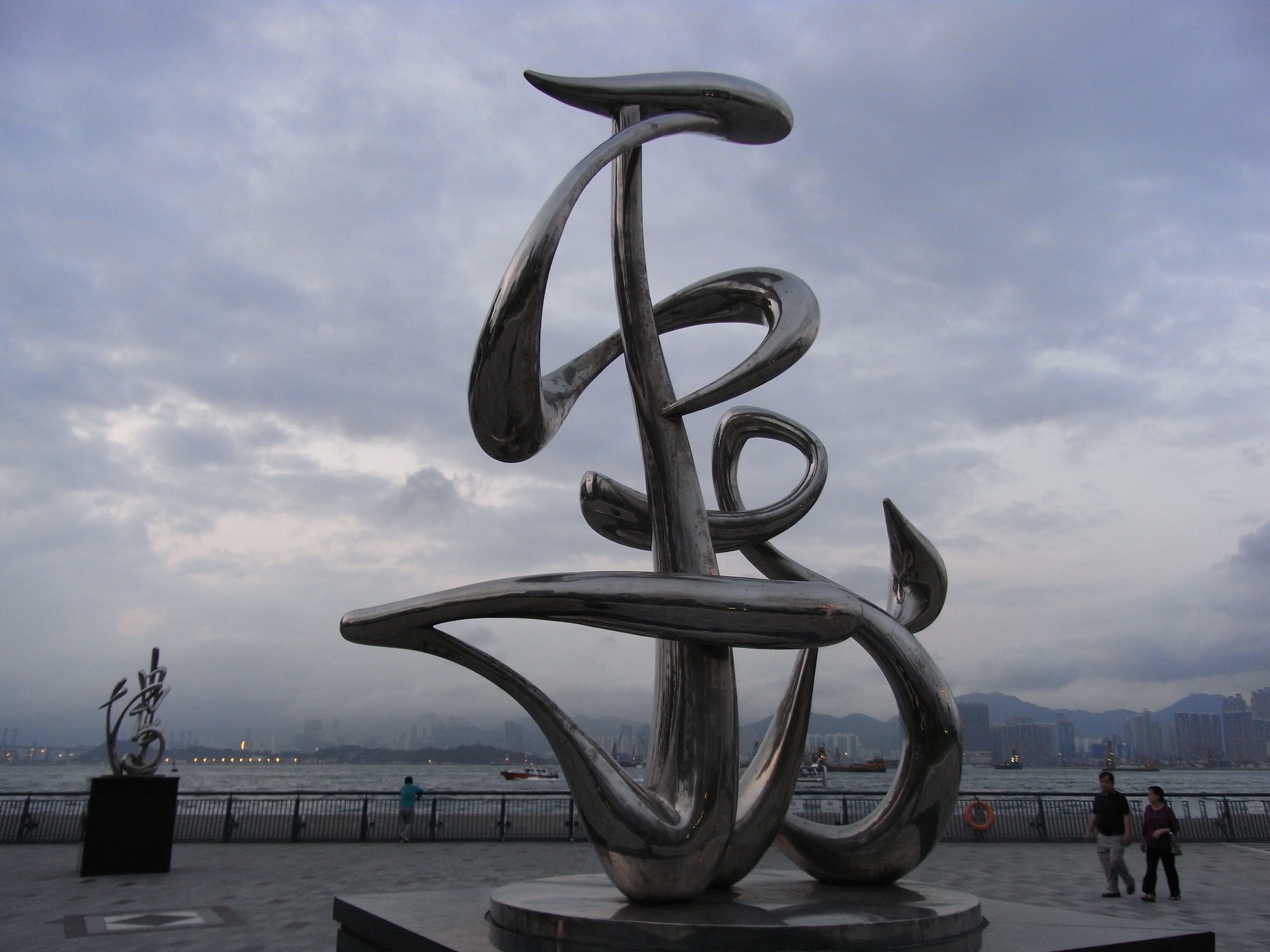
Equality at the Sun Yat-sen Memorial Park in Hong Kong

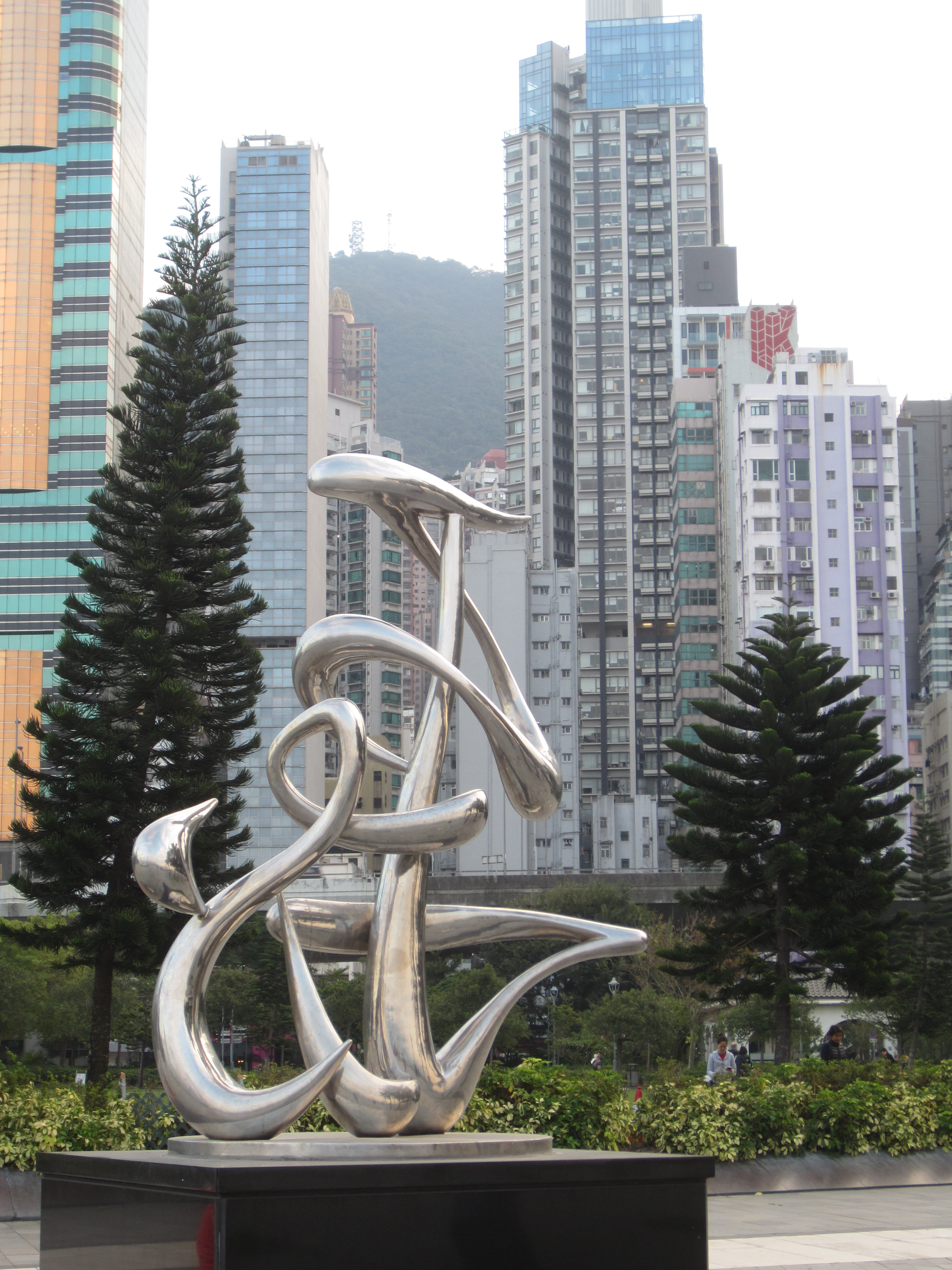
Equality at the Sun Yat-sen Memorial Park in Hong Kong

== SARS Memorial ==
The Fighting Against SARS Memorial Architectural Scene (弘揚抗疫精神建築景觀) is located in Hong Kong Park. It opened in 2005, and honors the medics who died during the 2003 SARS outbreak in Hong Kong. This memorial serves as in inspiration for designers of other such memorials. All its statues were made by Chu Tat-shing.

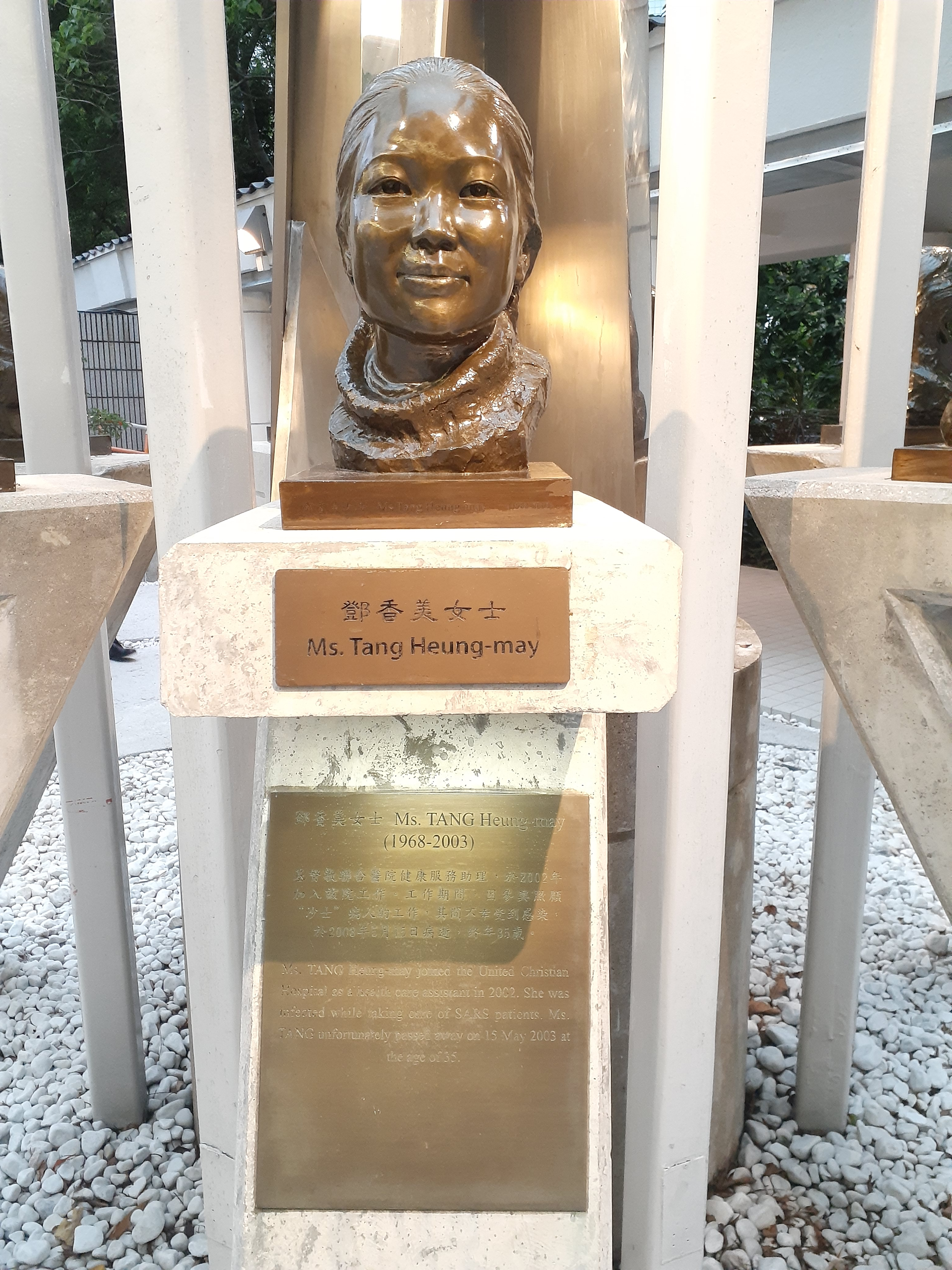
Ms. Tang Heung-may

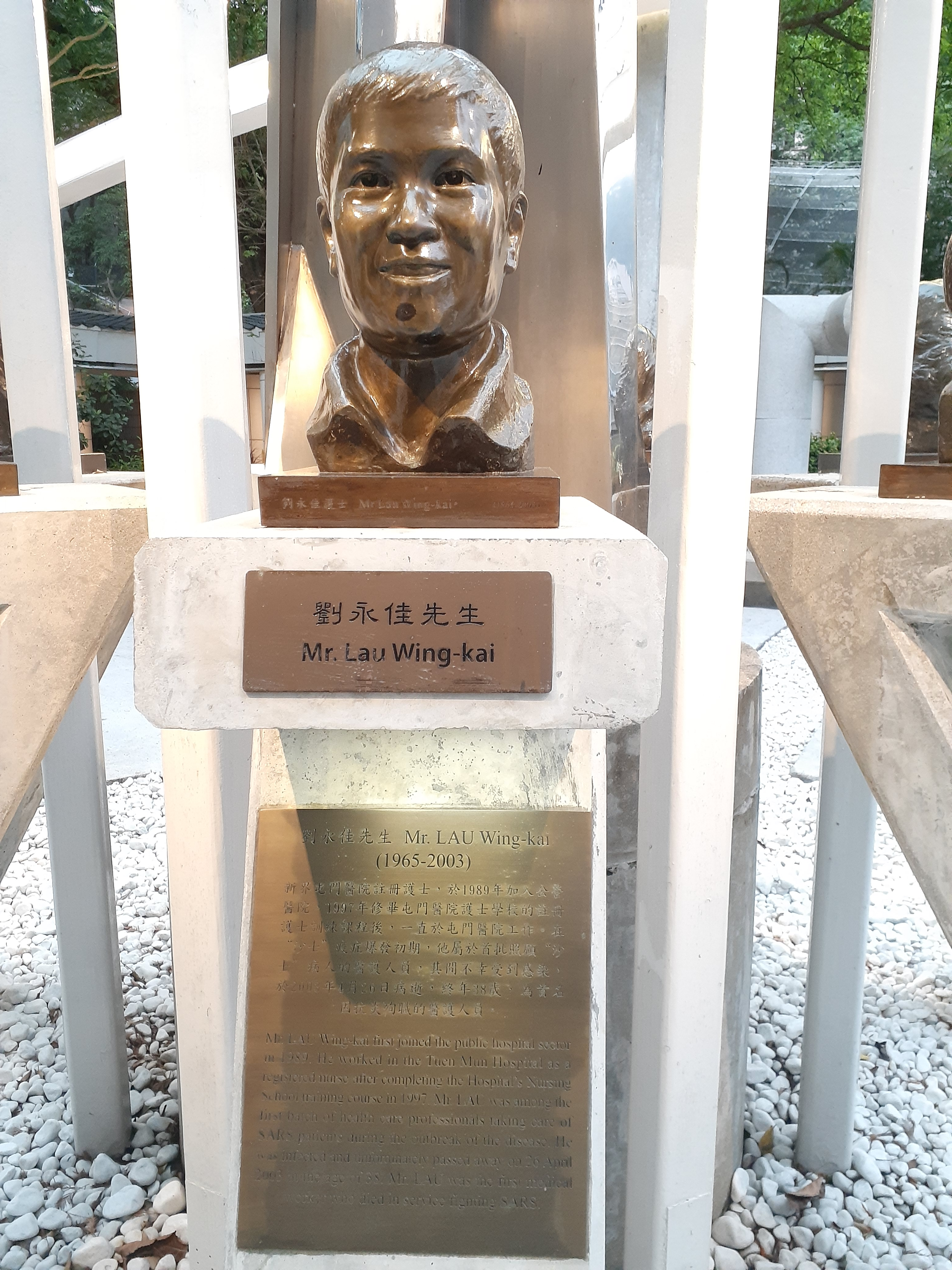
Mr. Lau Wing-kai

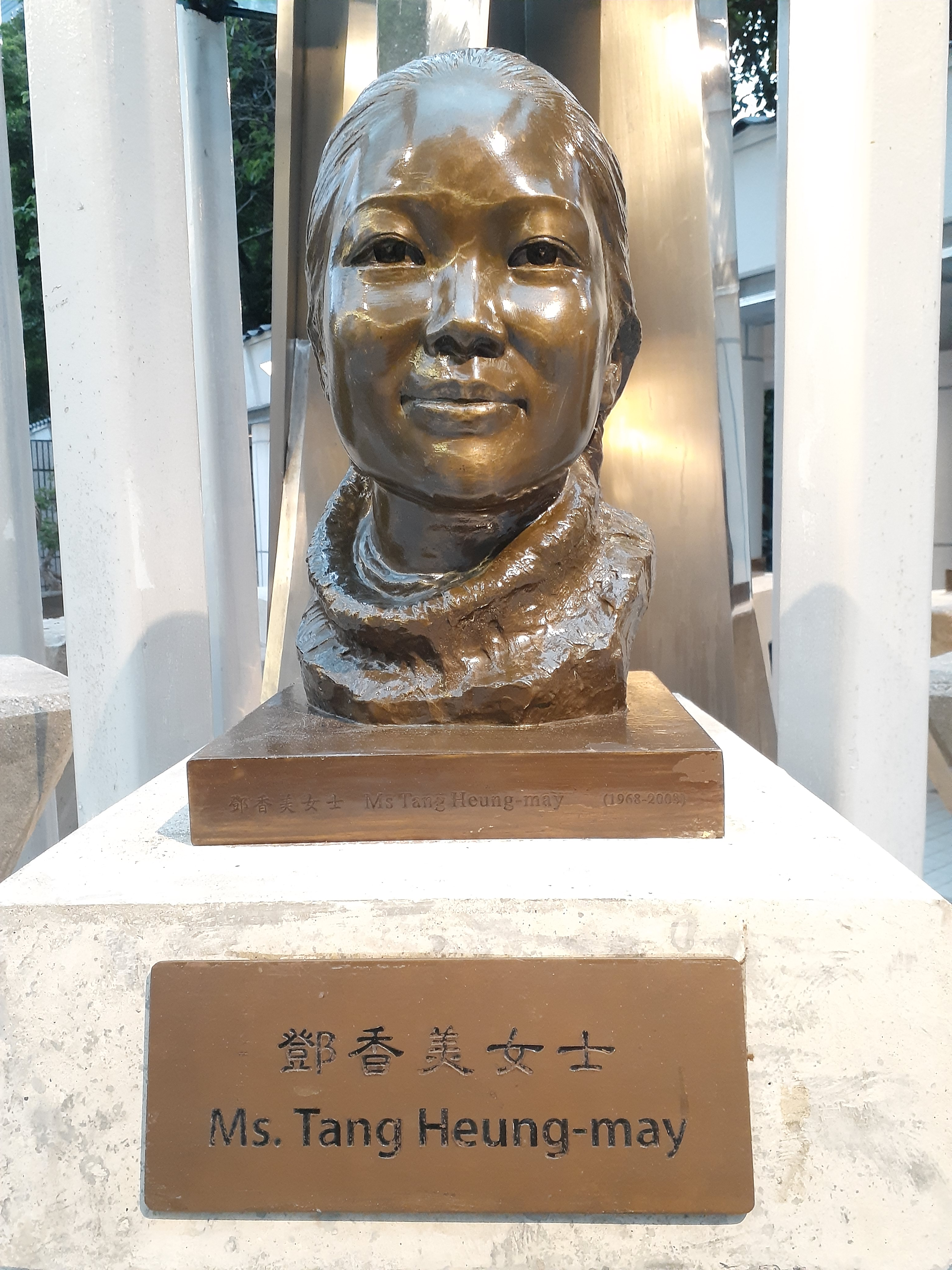
Ms. Tang Heung-may

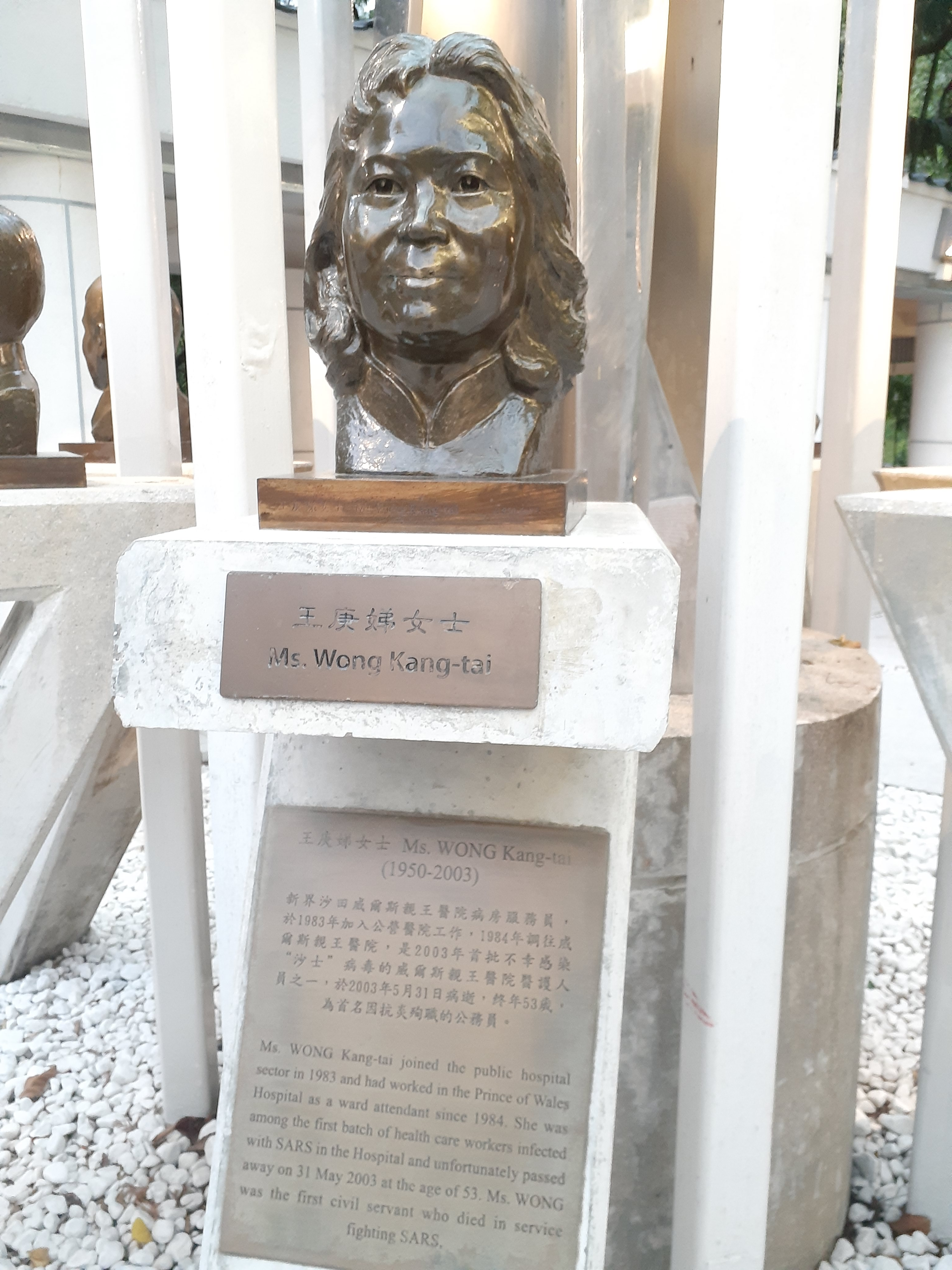
Ms. Wong Kang-tai

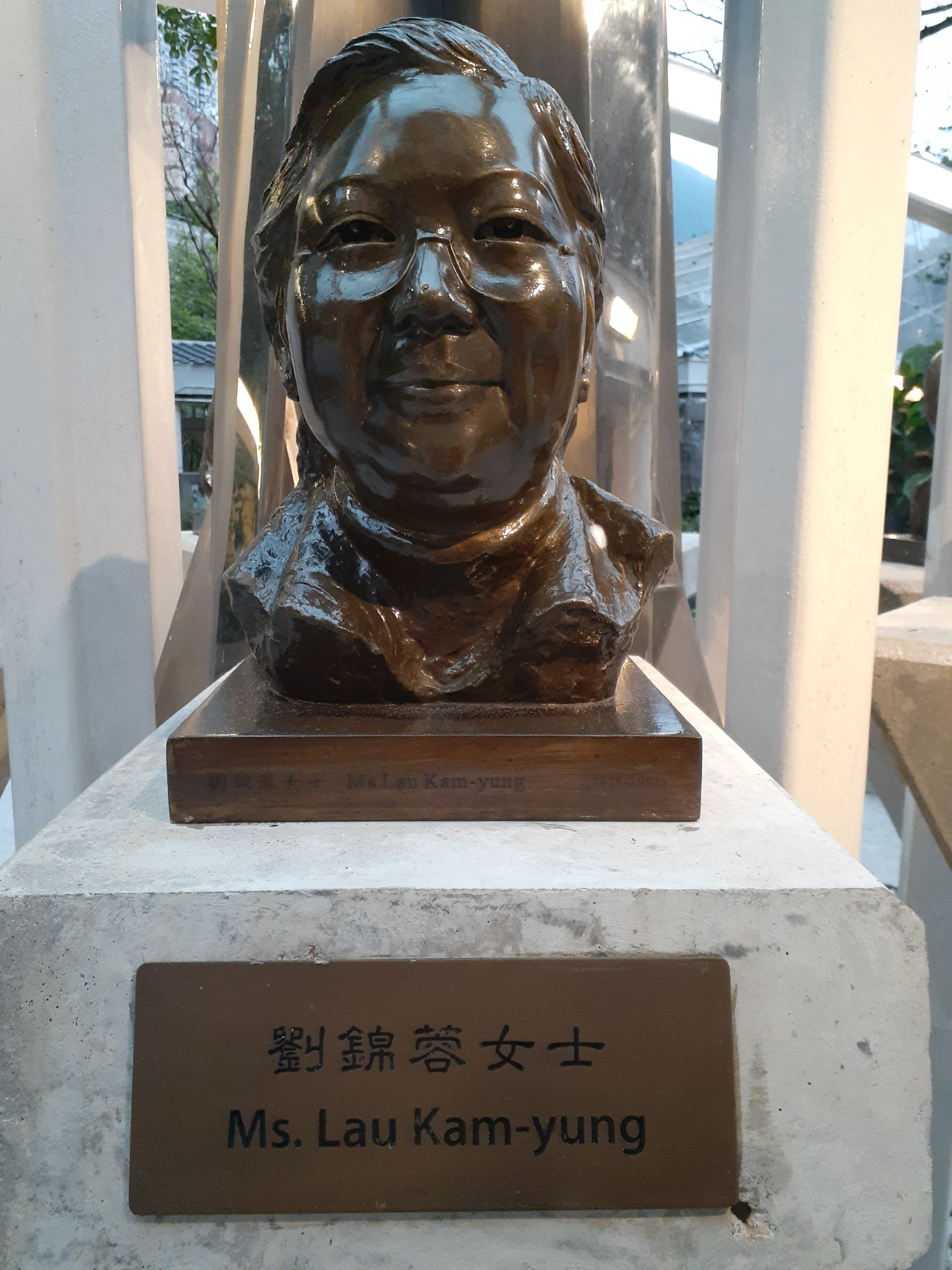
Ms. Lau Kam-yung

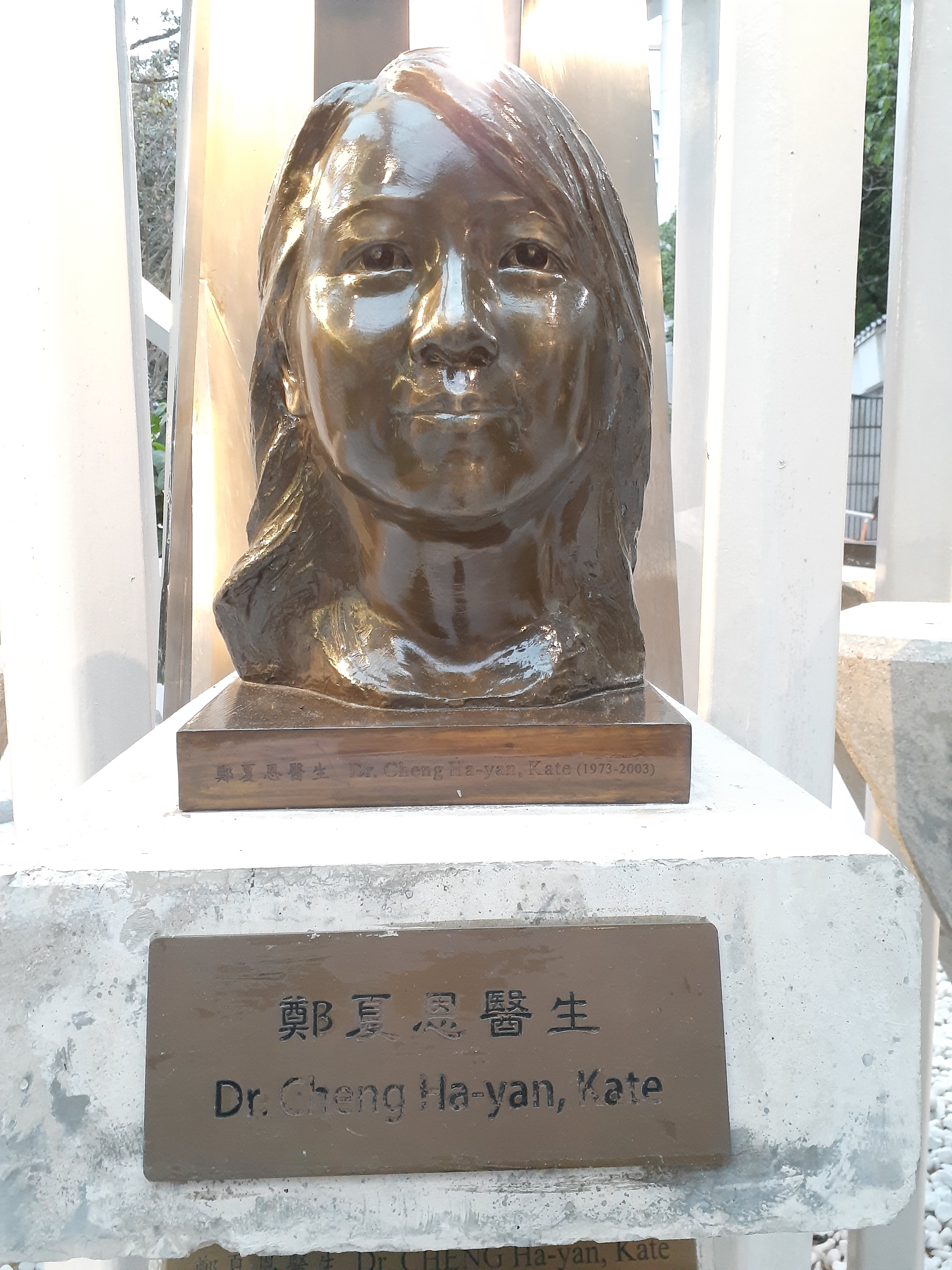
Dr. Cheng Ha-yan, Kate

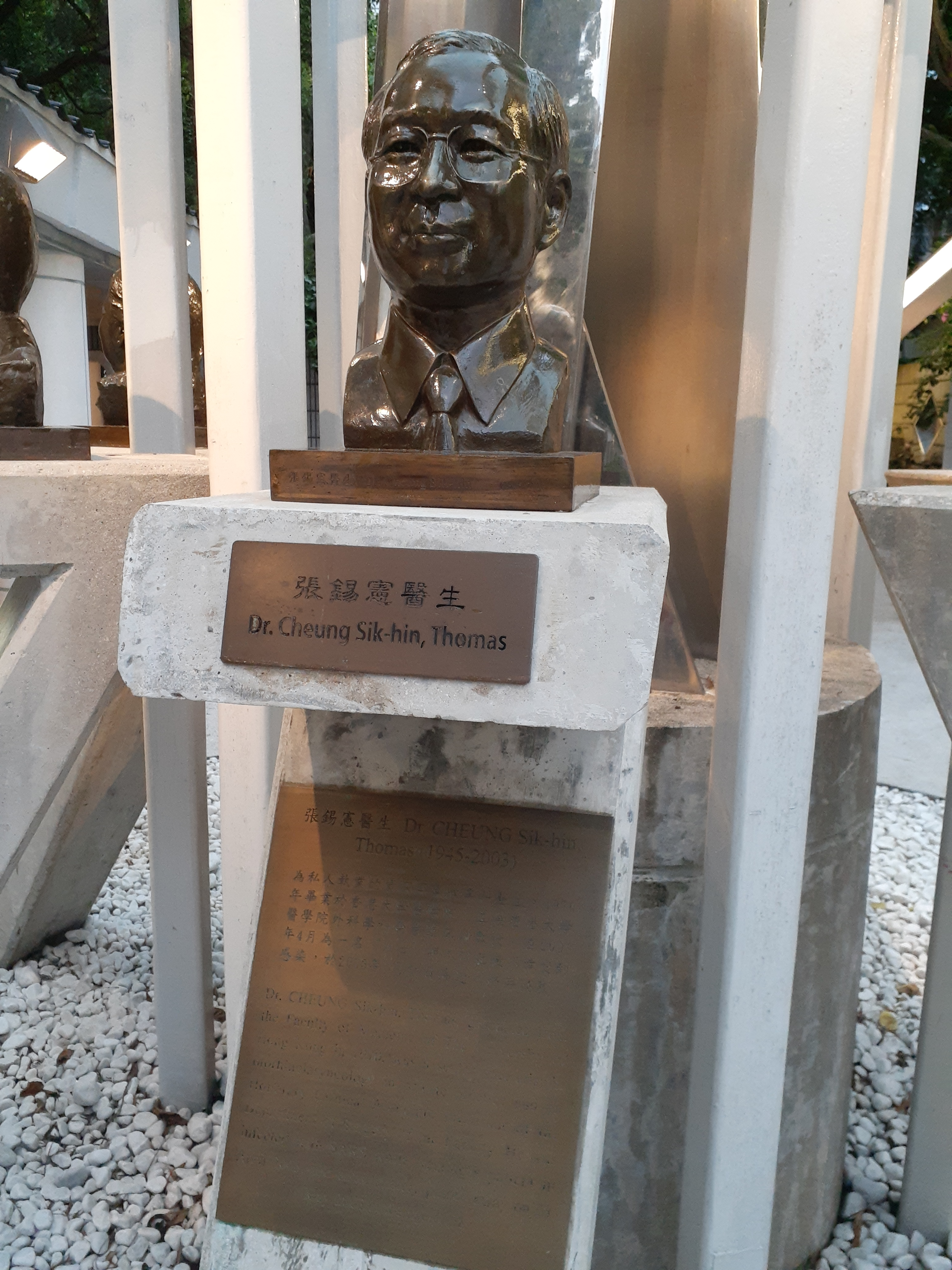
Dr. Cheung Sik-hin, Thomas

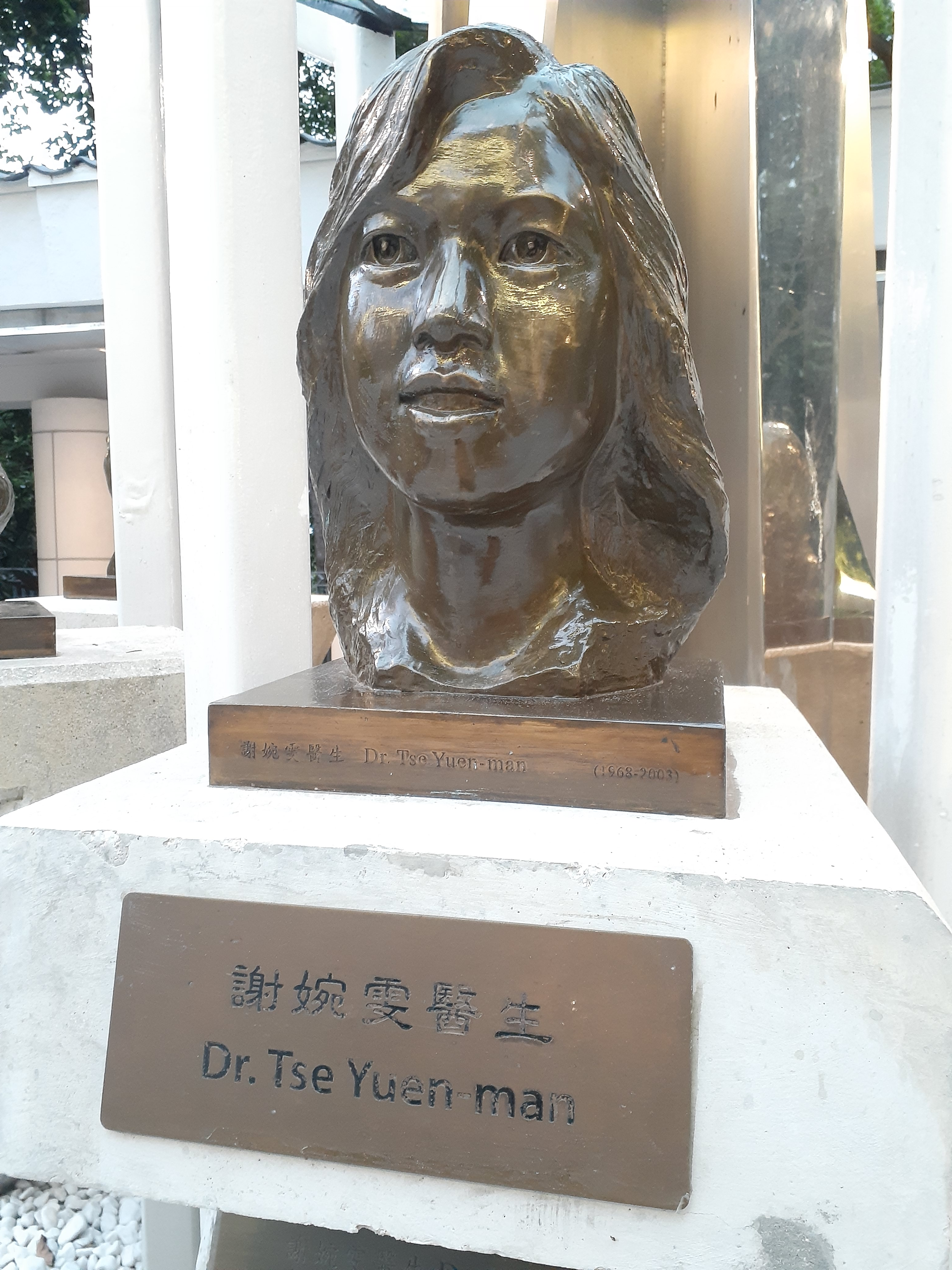
Dr. Tse Yuen-man

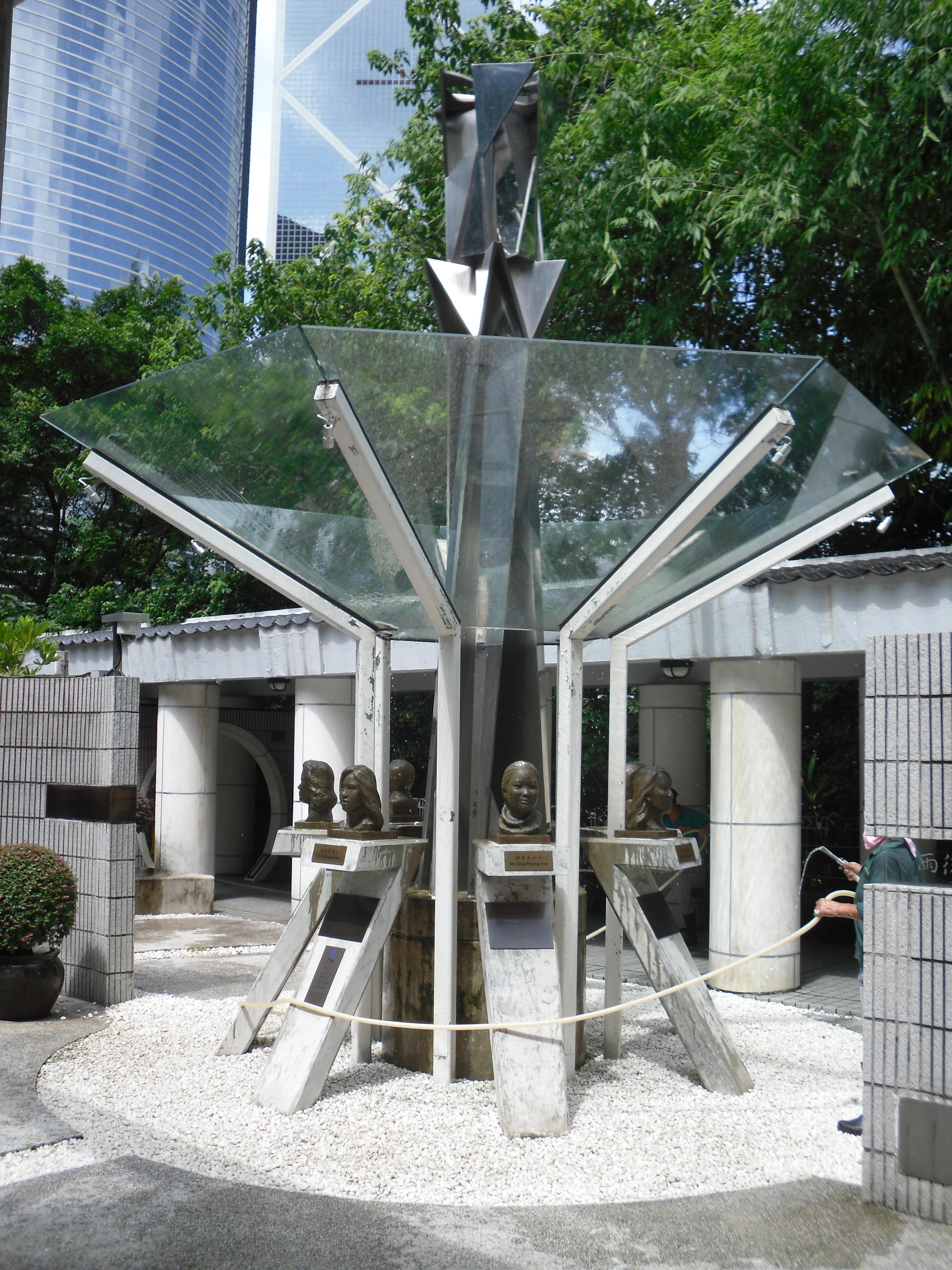
Fighting SARS Memorial Architectural Scene at Hong Kong Park.

== Other sculptures ==
- Sir Catchick Paul Chater bust and plaque for Hongkong Land.
- The Dance of Heaven and Earth at Kowloon Park in Hong Kong.
- Dr. Lee Quo Wei for the Chinese University of Hong Kong.
- Mr. Henry Fok Ying Tung at the Hong Kong University of Science and Technology.
- Professor Lao Sze-kwang for the Chinese University of Hong Kong.
- Professor Tang Chun-I for the Chinese University of Hong Kong.
- Girl in Ribbon Dance displayed at the Hong Kong Academy for Performing Arts.
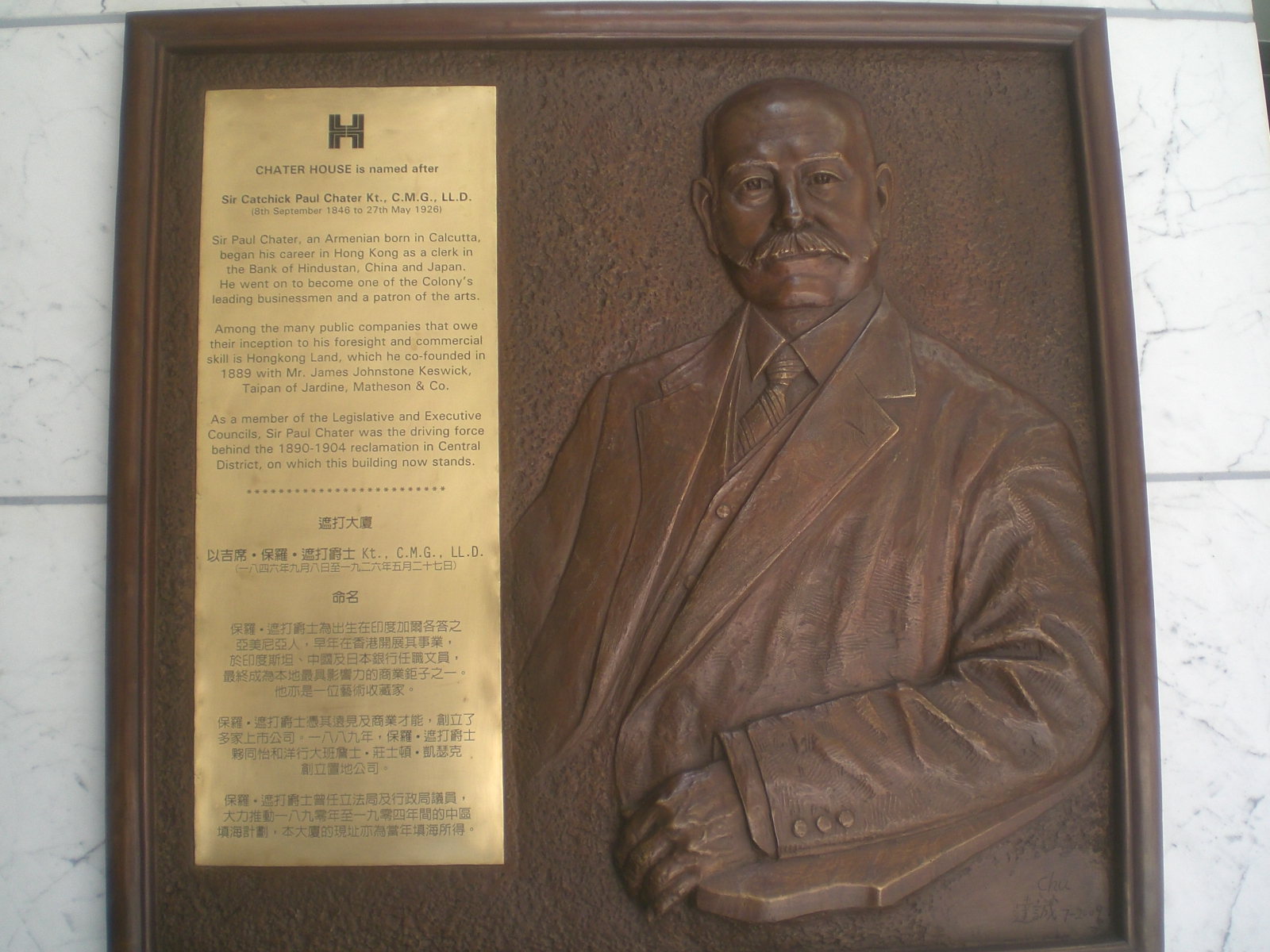
  Sir Catchick Paul Chater in Hong Kong.
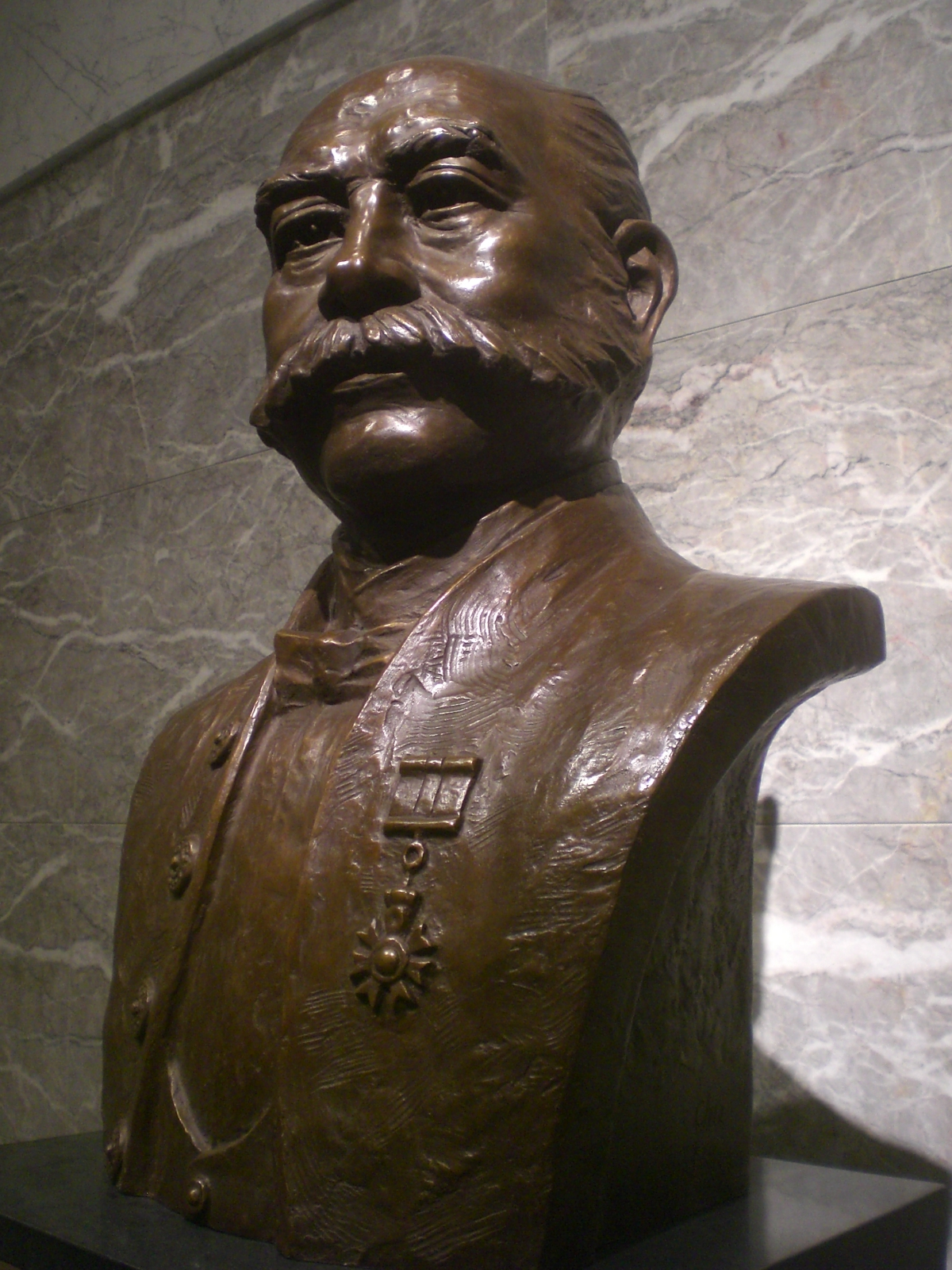
  Sir Catchick Paul Chater in Hong Kong.
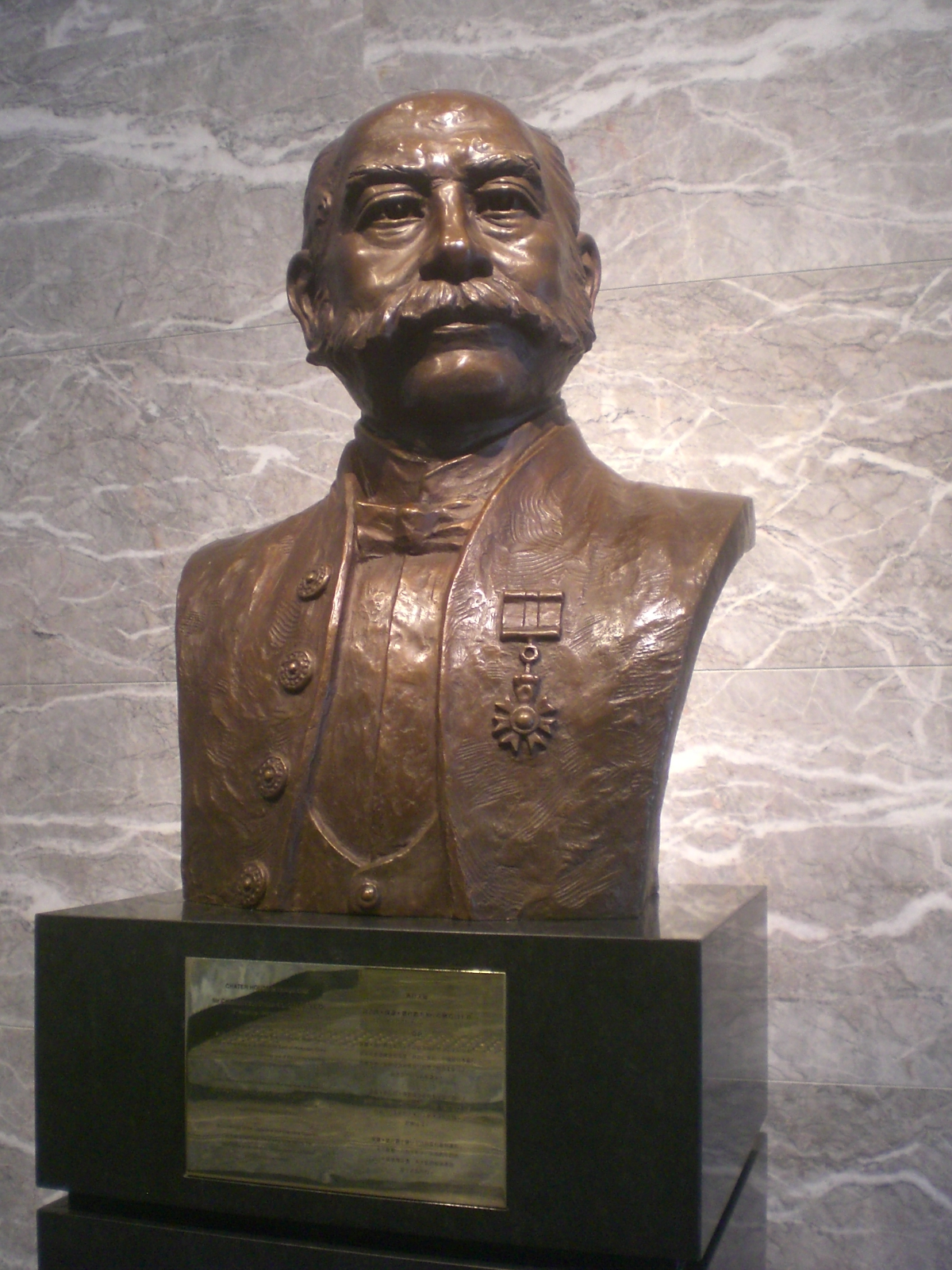
  Sir Catchick Paul Chater in Hong Kong.
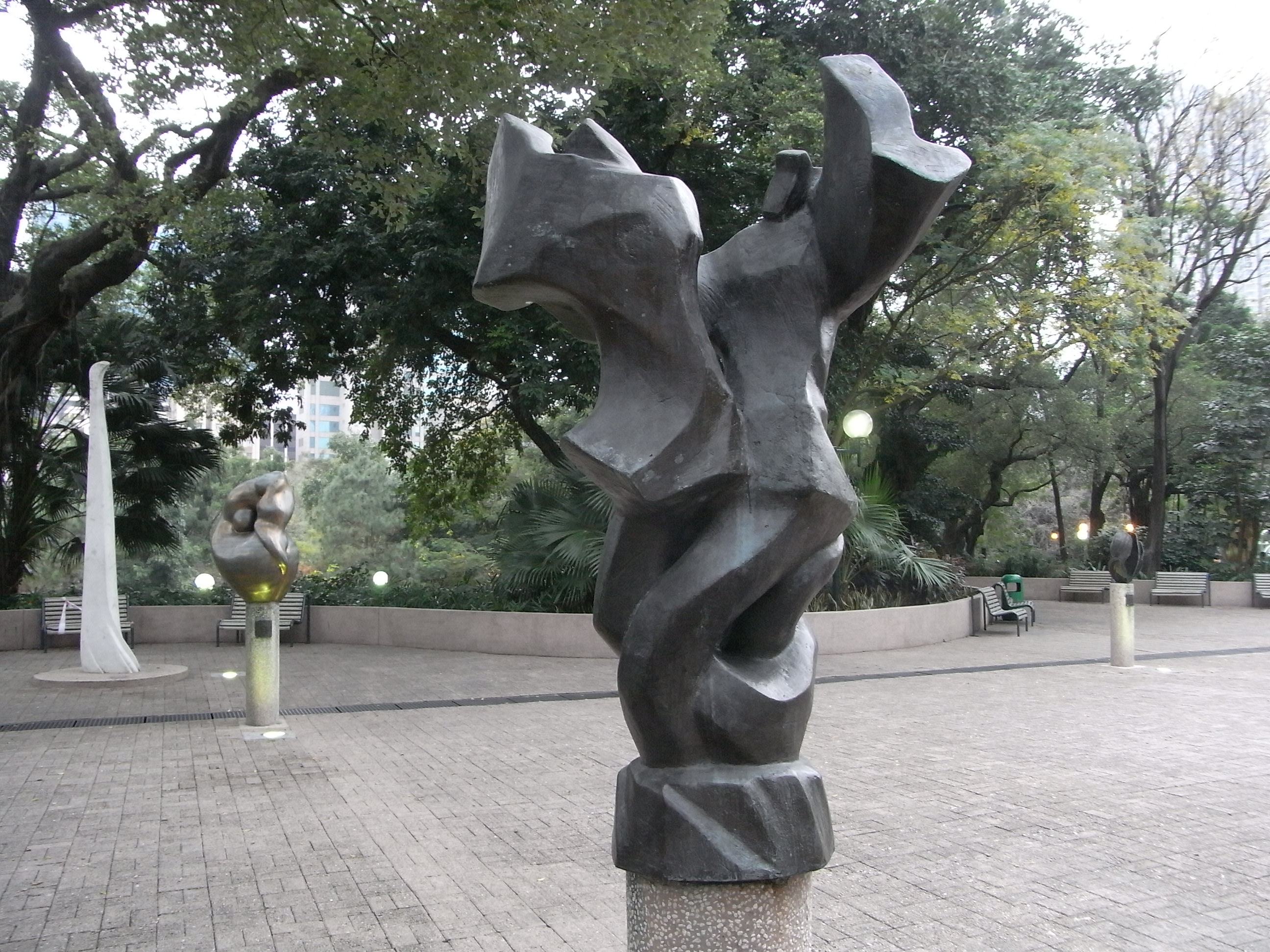
  Dance of Heaven and Earth in Kowloon Park, Hong Kong
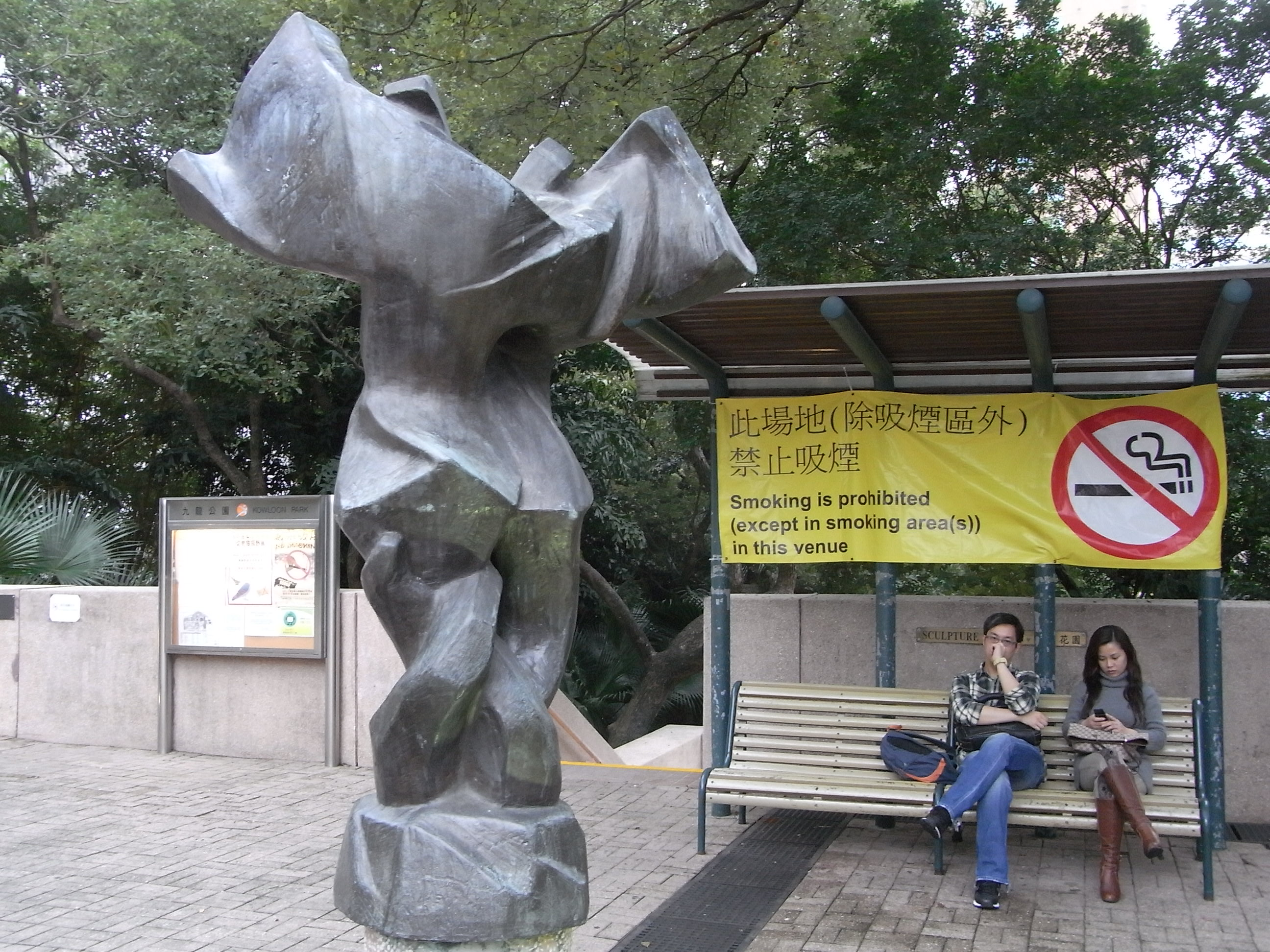
  Dance of Heaven and Earth in Kowloon Park, Hong Kong
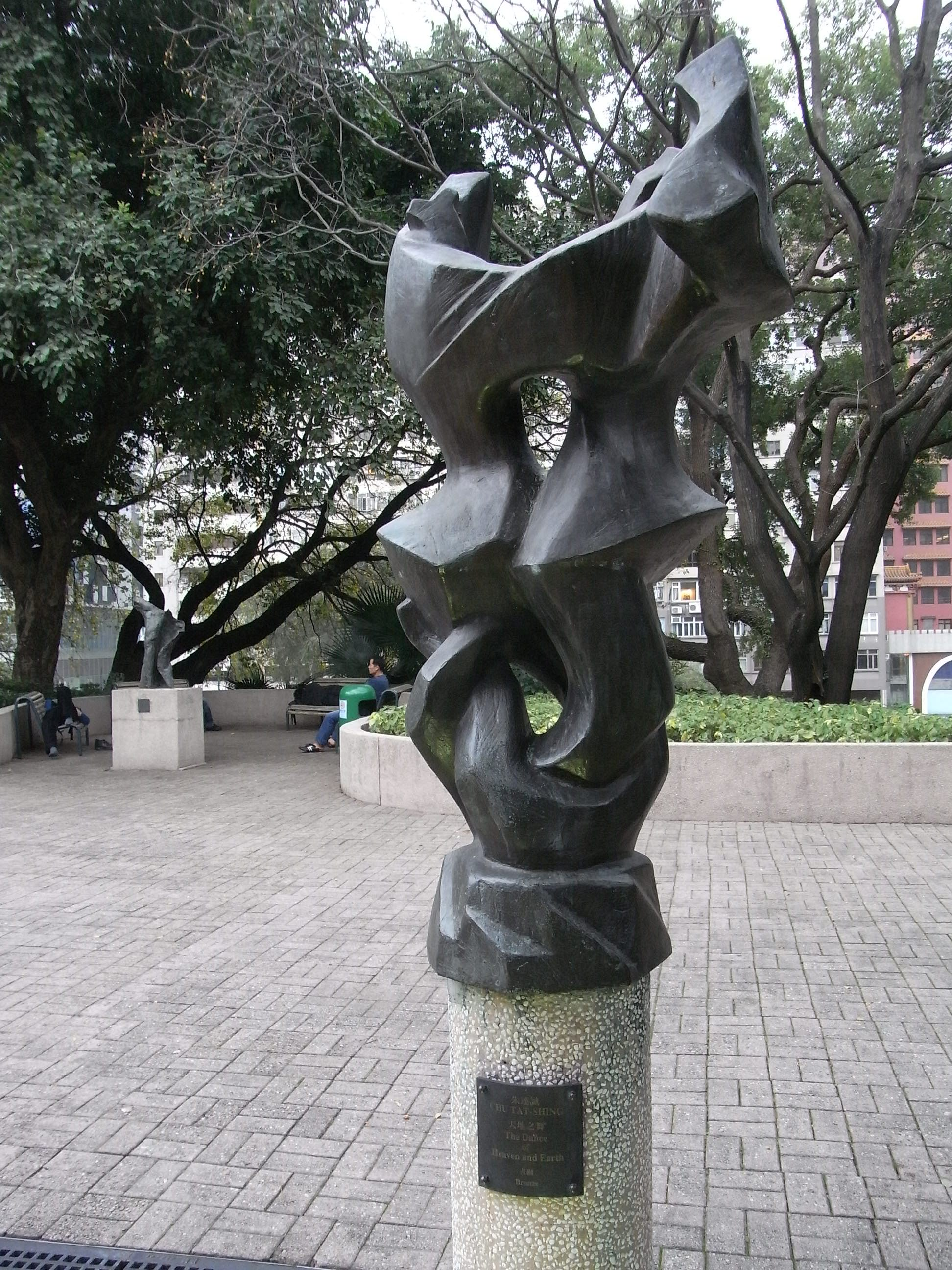
  Dance of Heaven and Earth in Kowloon Park, Hong Kong
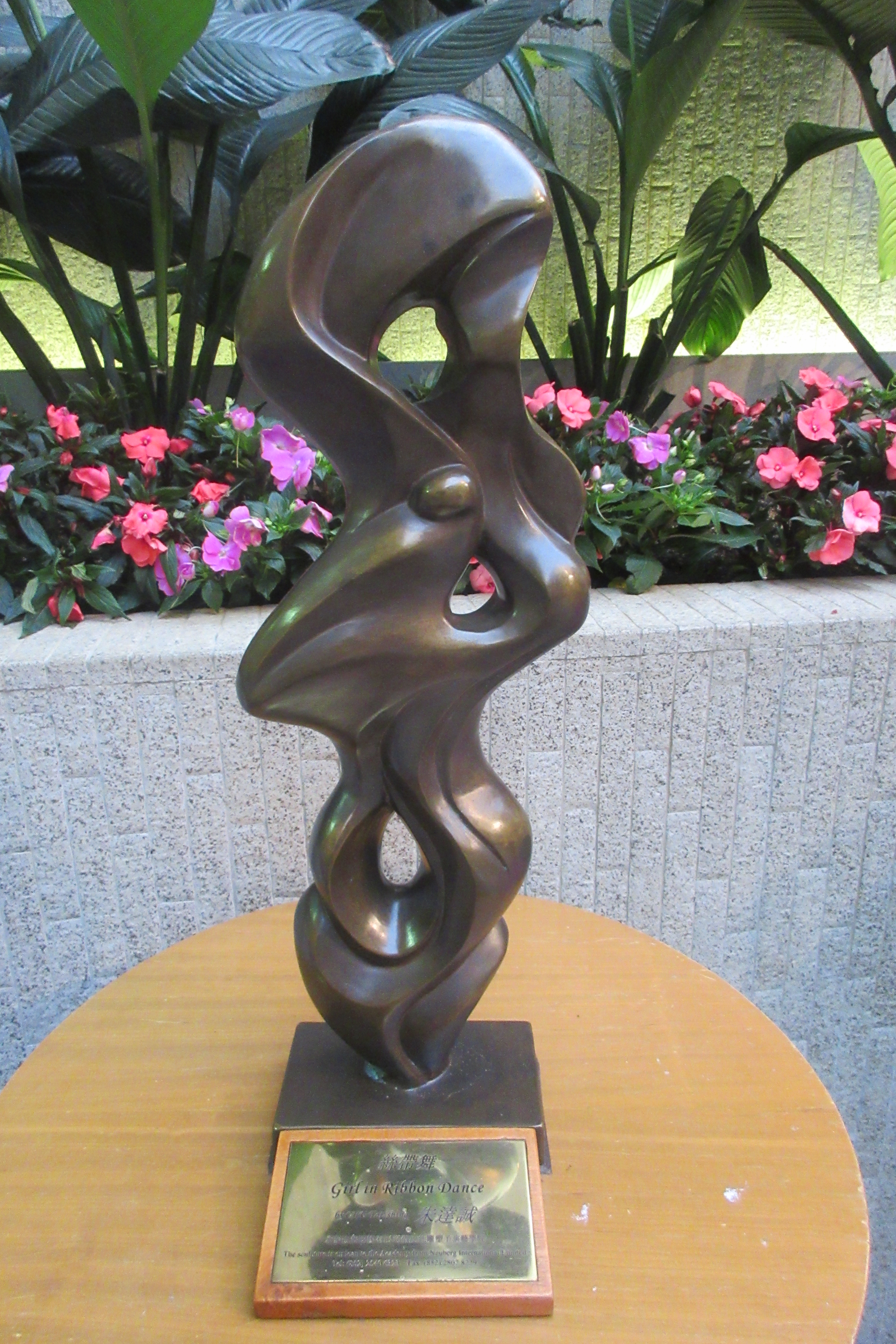
  Girl in Ribbon Dance at the Hong Kong Academy of Performing Arts

== Exhibitions ==
- 2010 - Classic
- 2011 - An Array of Insights
- 2012 - Hong Kong Sculpture Biennial
- 2014 - Regeneration: Exhibition of Hong Kong Sculpture Society
- 2017 - Aesthetic Contemplation
  - Figure paintings in black ink.
  - Video of the exhibition.
- 2019 - Art at Heart Sculpture Exhibition of Chu Tat Shing - A retrospective of his life's work at the Hubei Museum of Art, in Wuhan, China.
- 2020 - Instant Reflection
- 2020 - Breakthrough 2020 - Master of Art in Hong Kong
  - Interview with Chu Tat-shing about his work in this exhibit.
- 2022 - Greater Bay Area in the Eyes of Artists at the National Museum of China in Beijing.
