= Chu-class gunboat =

Class overview
- Builders: Kawasaki
- Operators: Imperial Chinese Navy; Republic of China Navy
- Succeeded by: Yongfeng-class gunboat
- Completed: 6
- Active: 0

General characteristics
- Type: Gunboat
- Displacement: 745 long tons (757 t)
- Length: 199.5 ft (60.8 m)
- Beam: 29.5 ft (9.0 m)
- Draught: 8 ft (2.4 m)
- Propulsion: 2 x boilers; Vertical triple-expansion steam engines driving 2 shafts; Total 1,350 indicated horsepower (1,010 kW)
- Speed: 13.5 knots (15.5 mph; 25.0 km/h)
- Complement: 101
- Armament: 2 × 4.7" gun; 2 × 12 pdr gun; 2 × 9 pdr gun

The Chu class were early-20th century gunboats built for the Imperial Chinese Navy of the Qing Empire. Six - Chu Yu, Chu Tung, Chu Chien, Chu Kuan, Chu Tai, Chu Yiu - were built by Kawasaki in Japan; they were launched in 1906-1907.

== History ==
The Nanyang Fleet discarded a number of older ships around 1902 and ordered new ships in 1904 and 1905. The order included the Chu and Kiang-class gunboats to replace the retired small gunboats, and were intended to serve on the Yangtze in the viceroyalties of Huguang and Liangjiang.

Nearly the entire class defected to the rebels in November during the 1911 Revolution. Chu Yu succeeded the gunboat Kiang Heng as flagship of the Yangtze squadron of the Republic of China Navy sometime after 1916.

The political fragmentation of the Warlord Era following Yuan Shikai's death extended to the navy. Admiral Cheng Biguang, commander-in-chief of the navy, defected with part of the fleet to Sun Yat-sen in Guangzhou. Chu Yiu joined the Guangzhou fleet later, and then the mass defection from that fleet in December 1923. The gunboat ended up with Wu Peifu's North-East Squadron (NES) at Qingdao. Weapons from NES ships were transferred to reinforcements from the Central Fleet for commonality; by 1929 Chu Yiu was armed with only two 9-pounder guns. In March 1926, the gunboat supported the amphibious landing of Zhang Zuolin's forces near the Taku Forts controlled by Feng Yuxiang.

The remainder of the Chus were part of Central Fleet by March 1927. The Central Fleet was neutral and avoided participating in the civil war by withdrawing its gunboats from the Yangtze to Shanghai. However, when the Central Fleet joined the Kuomintang on March 14 Chu Yu, Chu Chien, and Chu Tung had been redeployed to Jiujiang. The gunboats took Chiang Kai-shek - aboard Chu Yu - to capture Nanjing at the end of the month.

In 1933, Chu Yiu briefly mutinied after the failed assassination attempt on Admiral Shen Honglie.

The Chus saw action during the Second Sino-Japanese War. Chu Yu was attacked on 28-29 September 1937 near Jiangyin and sank on October 2. Chu Tai was damaged and beached near Fuzhou in 1938 and then destroyed by aircraft in 1941. Chu Kuan, Chu Chien and Chu Tung retreated up the Yangtze in 1938 and later became part of the ROCN's First Squadron.
