= Yongfeng-class gunboat =

Early-20th century gunboats built for the Chinese navy

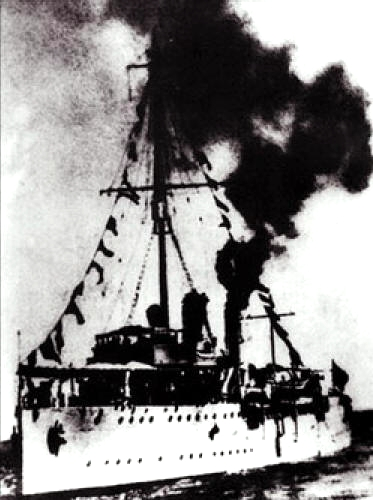

Class overview
- Builders: Kawasaki; Jiangnan Shipyard
- Operators: Republic of China Navy; Imperial Japanese Navy; Reorganized National Government of the Republic of China
- Preceded by: Chu-class gunboat
- Completed: 4
- Preserved: 1

General characteristics
- Type: Gunboat
- Displacement: 860 long tons (870 t)
- Length: 205 ft (62 m) pp
- Beam: 29.5 ft (9.0 m)
- Draught: 10 ft (3.0 m)
- Propulsion: 2 x boilers; Vertical triple-expansion steam engines driving 2 shafts; Total: 1,350 indicated horsepower (1,010 kW) (Yongfeng, Yongxiang); 1,300 indicated horsepower (970 kW) (Yongjian, Yongji)
- Speed: 13.5 knots (15.5 mph; 25.0 km/h) (Yongfeng, Yongxiang); 13 knots (15 mph; 24 km/h) (Yongjian, Yongji)
- Complement: 105
- Armament: 1 × 4.1" gun (Yongfeng, Yongxiang); 1 × 4" gun (Yongjian, Yongji); 1 × 3" gun; 4 × 3 pdr gun; 2 × 1 pdr gun
- Armor: Deck: 25 mm (0.98 in)

The Yongfeng class were early-20th century gunboats built for the Chinese navy. They were enlarged sea-going versions of the Kiang- and Chu-class gunboats. The first ships, Yongfeng and Yongxiang, were built in Japan by Kawasaki; they were launched in 1912-1913. The remainder, Yongjian and Yongji, were built in 1915 by the Jiangnan Shipyard in China; these ships had added poop decks.

== History ==
=== Warlord Era ===
In 1909, the Imperial Chinese Navy of the Qing Empire began ordering ships from foreign yards to implement a new fleet plan; Japan received orders for the first two Yongfengs in 1910. The empire ended shortly afterwards with the 1911 Revolution. The programme was delayed when Yuan Shikai's succeeding Republic of China renegotiated loans in 1912. More ships were ordered in 1913 but financial difficulties and the First World War prevented any from being delivered. To compensate, the Jiangnan Shipyard was contracted to build two more Yongfengs; these and a few minor gunboats were the last ships to enter the Republic of China Navy (ROCN) for a decade.

The political fragmentation of the Warlord Era following Yuan's death extended to the navy. Admiral Cheng Biguang, commander-in-chief of the navy, defected with part of the fleet to Sun Yat-sen in Guangzhou; the fleet was joined by Yongfeng and Yongxiang. In 1922, Sun fled a coup to Hong Kong; he was carried by Yongfeng before transferring to a British warship. In 1923, Wu Peifu bribed Yongxiang and much of the Guangzhou fleet to abandon Sun. Yongfeng remained, being renamed Zhongshan after Sun's death in 1925, and becoming flagship of the remnants of the Guangzhou fleet. After defecting, Yongxiang joined the Admiral Yang Shuchuang's Central Fleet and then Wu's North-East Squadron (NES); for service in the NES, she was rearmed with four 6 pounder guns sourced from that squadron in 1924. In March 1926, the gunboat supported the amphibious landing of Zhang Zuolin's forces near the Taku Forts controlled by Feng Yuxiang. Yongjian and Yongji joined the Central Fleet. The Central Fleet was neutral, but joined the Kuomintang in March 1927 just before the Northern Expedition. By 1933, Zhongshan, Yongjian and Yongji were all part of the First Squadron of the Central Fleet, and Yongxiang was in the NES (called the Third Squadron.)

In 1926, Chiang Kai-shek used the actions of Zhongshan as a pretext to purge Communist influence from the National Revolutionary Army in the Canton Coup. Yongji fought Communist forces in the Changsha area in 1930. In 1933, Yongxiang briefly mutinied after the failed assassination attempt on Admiral Shen Hunglieh.

=== Second Sino-Japanese War ===
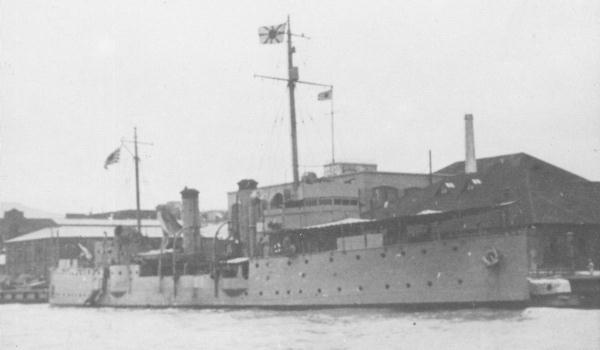
Asuka in 1942

The 1937 Japanese invasion inflicted extensive and early losses on the ROCN. Admiral Shen scuttled the NES' ships, including Yongxiang, as blockships; guns were removed to equip Chinese field artillery. The Central Fleet retreated up the Yangtze while blocking the mouth near Jiangyin by sinking warships and merchant ships. Yongjian did not join the retreat because she was refitting at the Jiangnan Shipyard; the gunboat was subsequently sunk by aircraft on 25 August. Zhongshan, Yongji and other gunboats waited at Hankou to evacuate government officials to the wartime capital of Chongqing. They were subjected to air attack during the Battle of Wuhan; Yongji beached on 21 October and Zhongshan was sunk on 24 October.

Many Chinese ships lost in shallow water were salvaged by the Japanese. Yongxiang was raised at Qingdao and employed locally. Yongjian became harbour ship Asuka at Shanghai; she was converted into an anti-aircraft ship in 1945 and sunk by aircraft at the entrance of the Huangpu River in May 1945. Yongji served the puppet Reorganized National Government of the Republic of China as Hai Hsing.

=== Civil War and after ===
Yongji returned to ROCN service after the war.

Zhongshan was raised in 1997. Restoration was completed in 2001, and it went on display as a museum ship in May 2008 at the Zhongshan Ship Museum.
