= Chinese gunboat Zhongshan =

Gunboat of the Republic of China Navy

Coordinates: 30°20′54″N 114°7′46″E

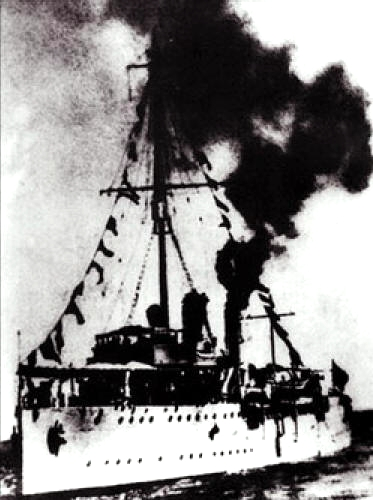
- SS Zhongshan

History

Republic of China
- Ordered: 1910
- Builder: Mitsubishi Shipbuilding Nagasaki Dockyard
- Laid down: 1910
- Launched: 1912
- Commissioned: 1913
- Maiden voyage: March 1913
- Renamed: 1925
- Fate: Sunk during the Battle of Wuhan on October 24, 1938
- Status: Recovered in 1997 and restored as a museum ship

General characteristics
- Class & type: Yongfeng-class gunboat
- Displacement: 780 tons
- Length: 65.873 m (216.12 ft)
- Beam: 8.8 m (29 ft)
- Draught: 3.048 m (10.00 ft)
- Speed: 14 knots (26 km/h; 16 mph)
- Complement: 140
- Armament: 1 × 4.1 inch/40 gun; 1 × 3 inch/50 gun; 4 × 47 mm/40 gun; 1 × 40 mm gun; 2 × 37/27 mm Maxim guns; 2 × 7.9 machine guns

SS Zhongshan
- Traditional Chinese: 中山艦
- Simplified Chinese: 中山舰
- Postal: SS Chung Shan
Transcriptions
Standard Mandarin
- Hanyu Pinyin: Zhōngshān Jiàn
- Wade–Giles: Chung-shan Chien
Yue: Cantonese
- Jyutping: Zung^{1}-saan^{1} Laam^{6}

SS Yongfeng
- Traditional Chinese: 永豐艦
- Simplified Chinese: 永丰舰
- Postal: SS Yung Feng
Transcriptions
Standard Mandarin
- Hanyu Pinyin: Yǒngfēng Jiàn
- Wade–Giles: Yung-feng Chien
Yue: Cantonese
- Jyutping: Wing^{5}-fung^{1} Laam^{6}

SS Zhongshan, formerly romanized as Chung Shan, was a Chinese gunboat built in Japan in 1913. It was originally known as SS Yongfeng (romanized at the time as Yung Feng or Wong Feng), before being renamed in 1925 in honor of Sun Yat-sen. Zhongshan was sunk by the Imperial Japanese Navy during the Second Sino-Japanese War, but was later raised and restored as a museum ship in Wuhan.

== Construction ==
SS Yongfeng was the first of four Yongfeng-class gunboats ordered from Mitsubishi by the Qing Empire in 1910. Under the deal signed between the Qing naval minister Prince Rui, his deputy Admiral Sa Zhenbing, and the Japanese, the first two ships (including Yongfeng) would be built in Japan, while the second two would be built in China at Jiangnan Shipyard with Japanese technical assistance.

== Service history ==
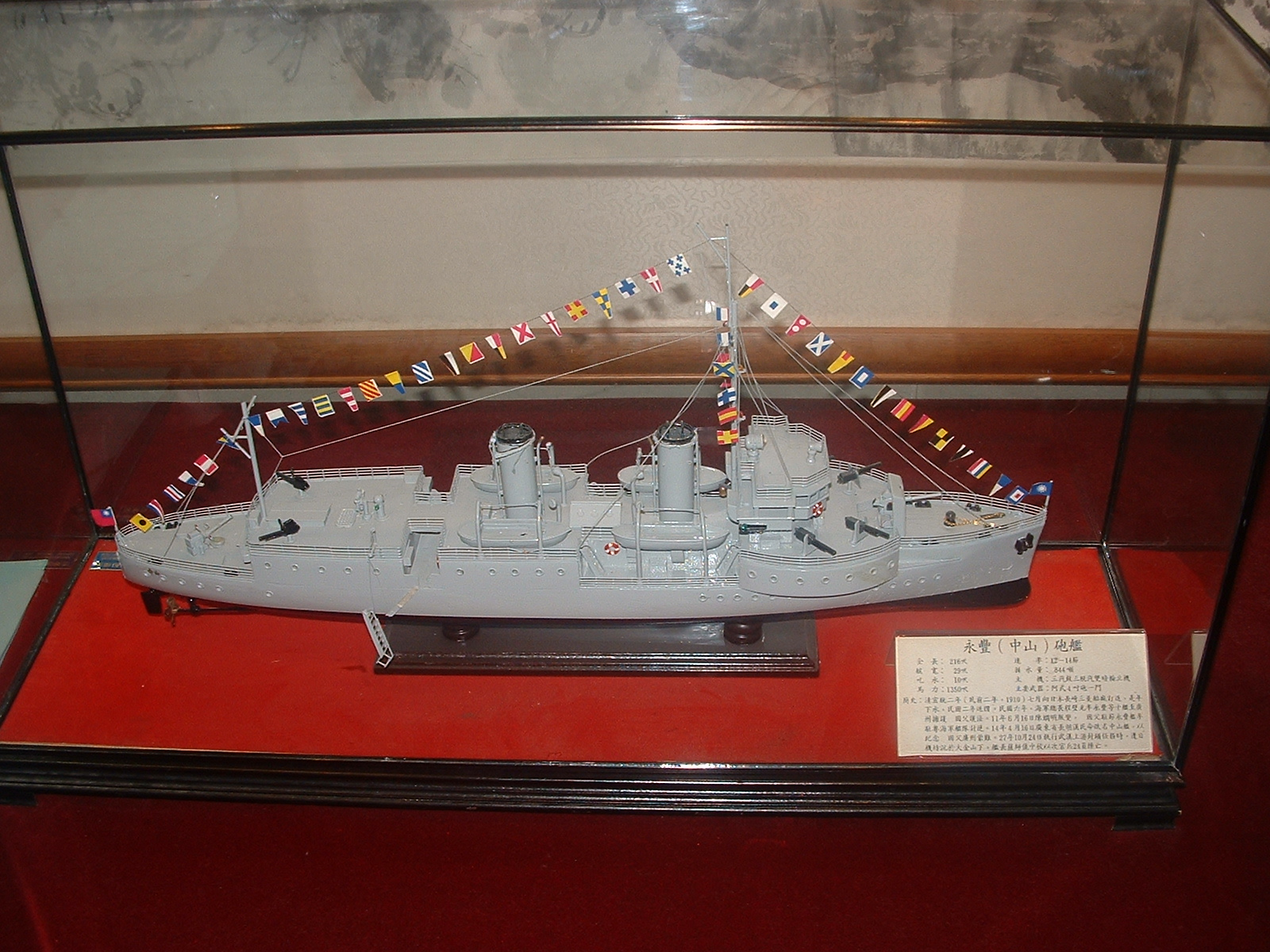
Model of SS Zhongshan

Yongfeng entered service as part of the Beiyang Fleet. In March 1913, it sailed to Shanghai, where it was based at Yuezhou.

It sailed south with Sun Yat-sen in July 1917, subsequently forming part of the Nationalist navy at Canton (now known as Guangzhou).

Just prior to Ye Ju's attack of the presidential palace on 16 June 1922, Sun Yat-sen fled to the Guangzhou naval yard and took refuge aboard the cruiser SS Haiqi (then Hai Ch'i). From there, he transferred to the SS Yongfeng, where he was joined by Chiang Kai-shek around the 27th or 29th. Yongfeng and other ships then fought past Pearl River fortresses controlled by Chen Jiongming while launching assaults and negotiating with the Guangzhou leadership for about 50 days. It avoided reprisals by anchoring off Huangpu, surrounded by foreign vessels Chen could not risk firing upon. Finally, Sun and Chiang left aboard a British ship to Hong Kong on 9 August, whence they departed for Shanghai. The Yongfeng carried Sun and his wife to Hong Kong in November 1924.

On 13 April 1925, the ship was renamed in honor of Sun Yat-sen, better known in China as "Sun Zhongshan", following his death the previous month.

In November 1925, the Nationalist navy was placed under the direction of the Soviet adviser Andrei S. Bubnov, who named the Communist Li Zhilong as its head. The voyage of Zhongshan and Baobi from Guangzhou to Huangpu (Whampoa) on 18 March 1926 set off the Canton Coup.

She patrolled the southern coasts of China against pirates after the Northern Expedition, and she rescued the steamship Xinhua in 1928.

In the Second Sino-Japanese War, SS Zhongshan participated in the Battle of Wuhan. On 24 October 1938, she was bombed and sunk in the Yangtze River by the Imperial Japanese Navy with 25 casualties, including Captain Sa Shijun, a nephew of Sa Zhenbing.

== Recovery ==
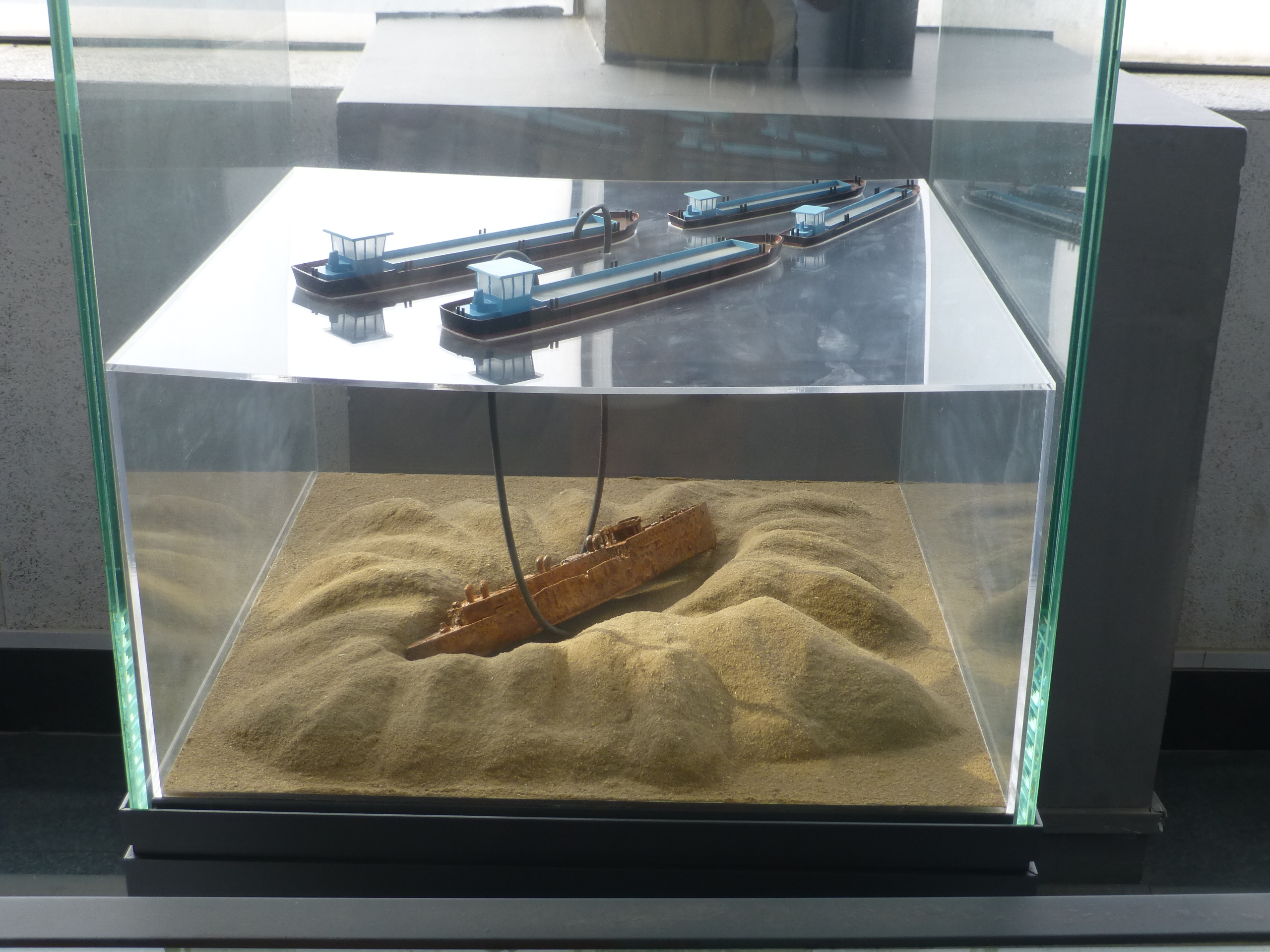
Salvaging of SS Zhongshan. (A model in the Zhongshan Warship Museum)

Hubei's provincial cultural department received permission to plan the recovery of Zhongshan in 1986, and the wreck was salvaged from the Yangtze on 28 January 1997. By 2001, it was restored to its appearance c. 1925, except for some of the damage which it sustained when the ship was sunk in 1938. The restored Zhongshan is now located in the Zhongshan Warship Museum in Wuhan. The facility has been described as "China's first floating museum".

The museum is located in Jinkou Subdistrict of Wuhan's suburban Jiangxia District, some 25 km southwest of downtown Wuchang. In 2003, relics from the ship were also displayed at Hong Kong's Museum of Coastal Defense.

=== Gallery ===
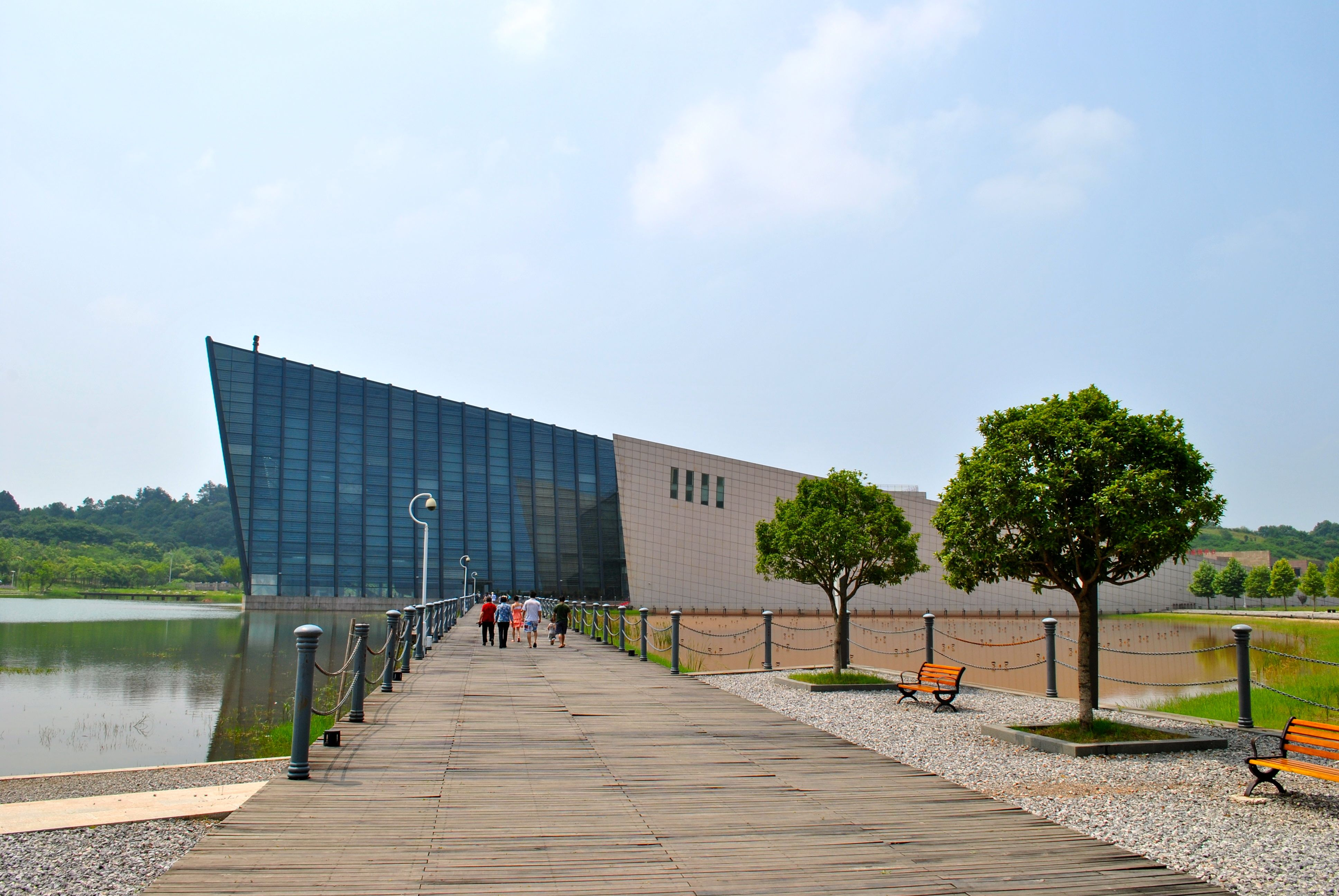
Zhongshan Warship Museum (zh:中山舰博物馆) in Wuhan

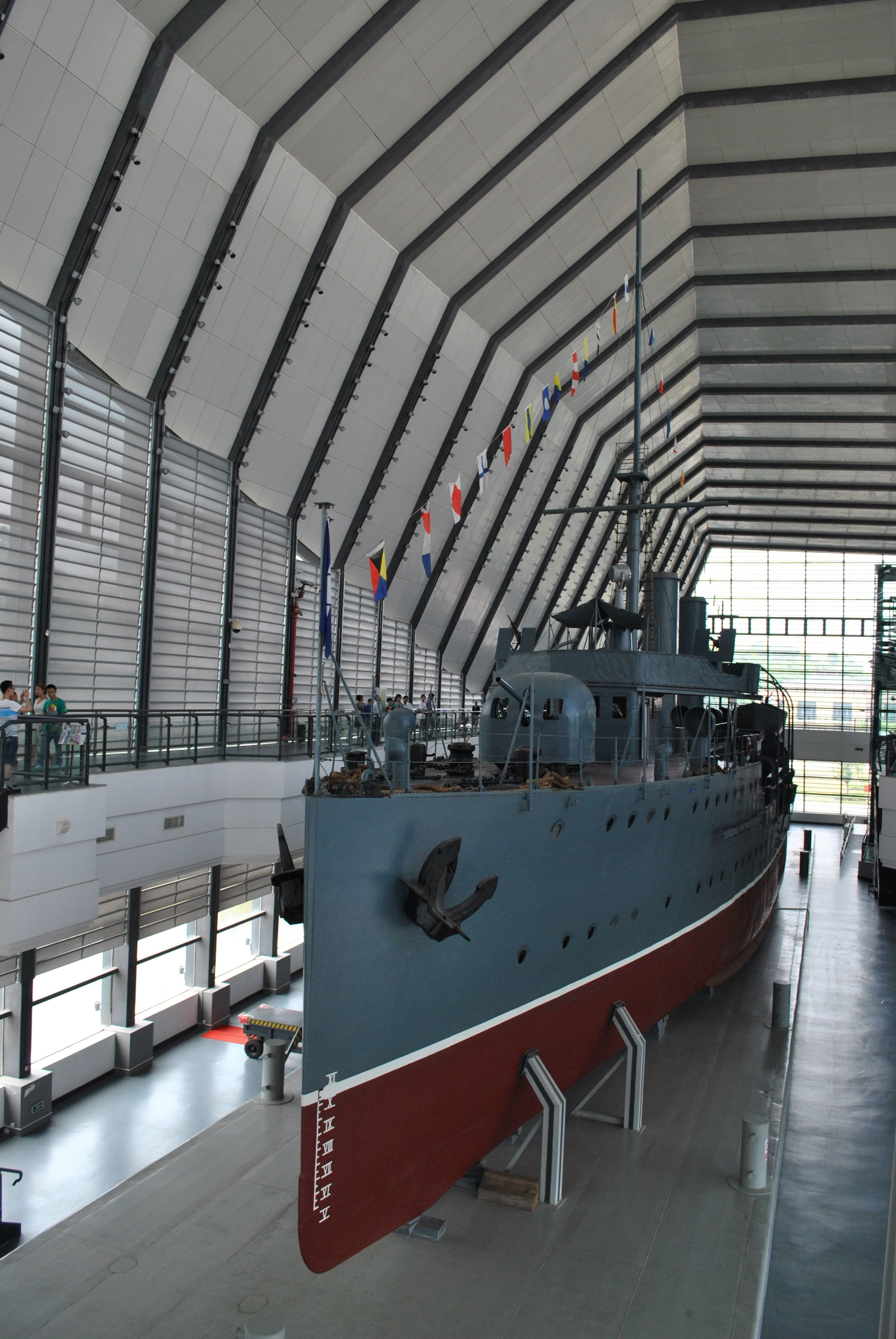
The restored Zhongshan inside the museum

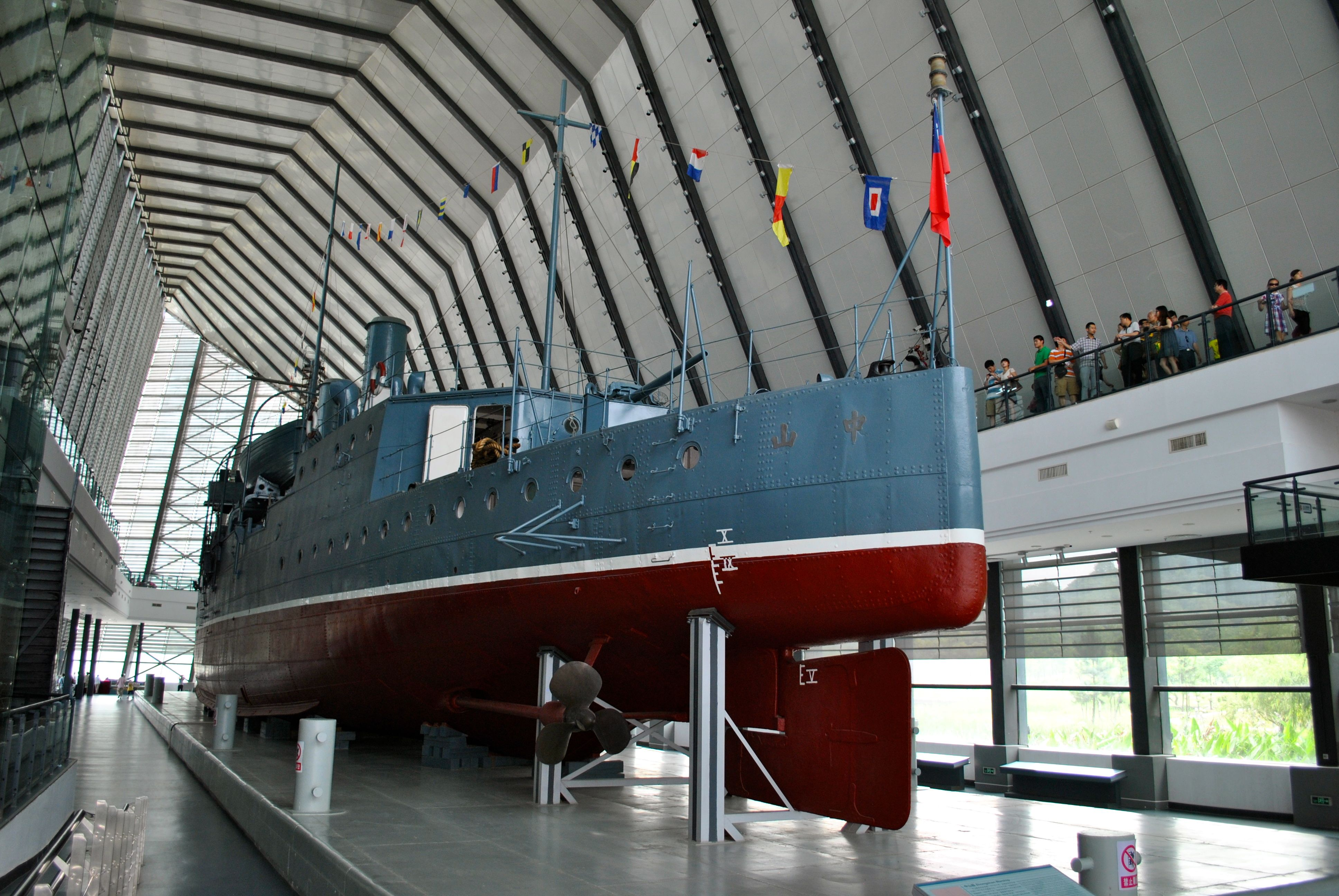
Zhongshan seen from the stern

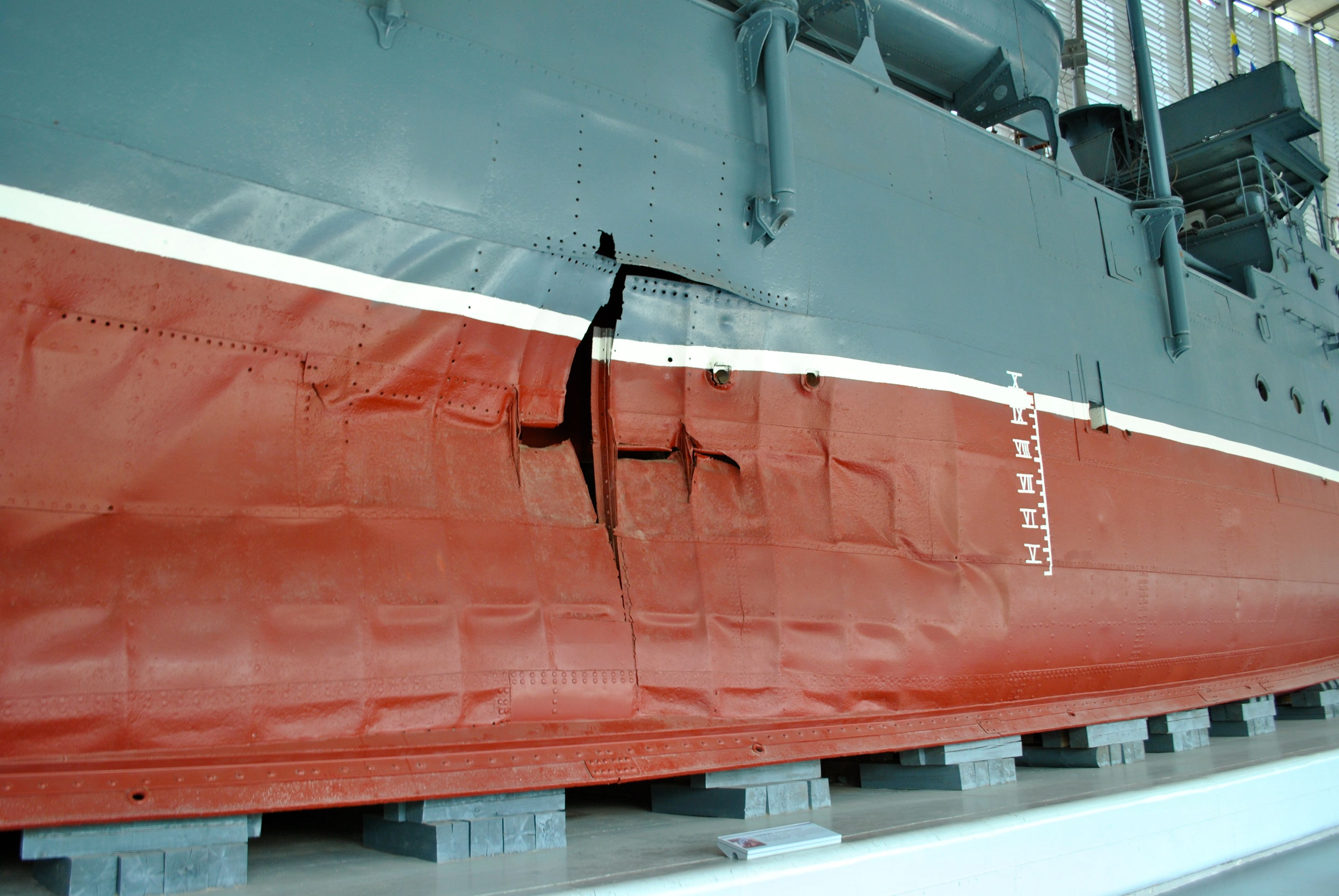
Damage the ship sustained during her sinking

== See also ==
- Sun Yat-sen, an American Liberty ship
- Chinese battleship Dingyuan, a replica of this ship was constructed which operates as a museum ship in Weihai.
