= North–South divide in Taiwan =

Overview of the uneven distribution of resources in Taiwan

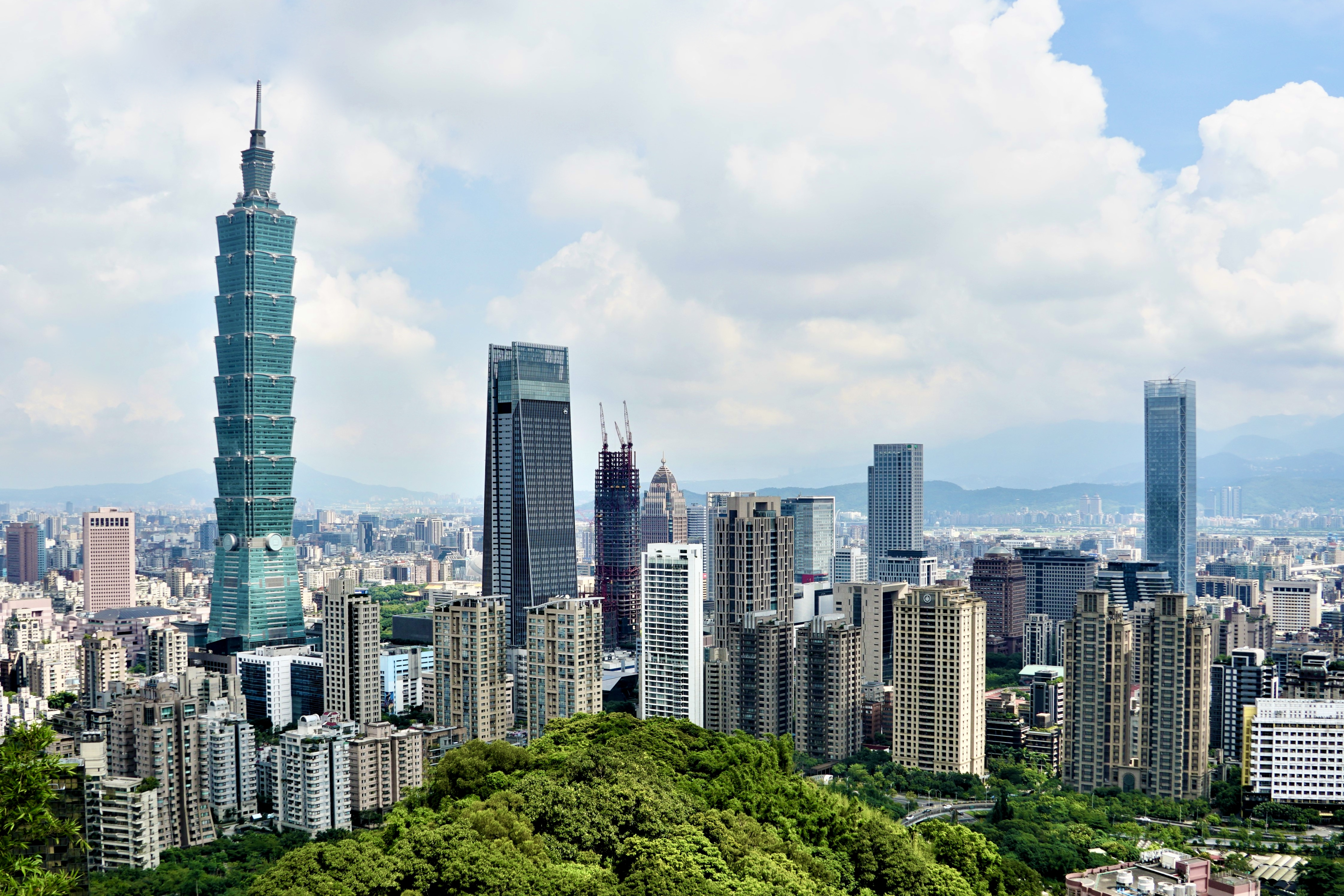
Taipei, the capital city of Taiwan, whose name translates literally to the North of Taiwan in a narrow sense, while Zhuoshui River whose name broadly serves as an imaginative line that divides Taiwan into Northern and Southern Taiwan.

In Taiwan, the North–South divide (Chinese: 重北輕南; pinyin: Zhòng Běi Qīng Nán; lit. 'Heavy North', 'Light South') refers to the uneven distribution of resources in regard to political, wealth, medical, economic development, education, and other aspects across Taiwan over past decades that has drawn the social and cultural differences between Northern Taiwan and Southern Taiwan.

== Development ==
The divide has often been attributed to government bias. Following its defeat by the Chinese Communist Party in the Chinese Civil War and the Nationalists' subsequent flight from the Chinese mainland, the Kuomintang relocated its headquarters to Taipei in the north of Taiwan.

Since the Nationalist government's retreat to Taiwan in 1949, the Kuomintang has held power for more than 60 years non-consecutively (1945–2000, 2008–2016), compared to the Democratic Progressive Party's 16 years (2000–2008, 2016–now). It is claimed that owing to the Kuomintang's long-standing bias, especially over the White Terror period, the gap between the north and the south in terms of social and economic development has gradually widened. The KMT was alleged to have concentrated investment in technological fields in its base in northern Taiwan, especially in Hsinchu and the Greater Taipei Metropolis area, while investment in the south of Taiwan was mainly in industry. As industry relocated to Mainland China over the past decades, leading to slower growth in southern Taiwan, there has been a brain drain of younger, college-educated Taiwanese from the south to the north where higher-paying service and technology industries are located.

From 1990 to 1998, the Mayor of Kaohsiung, Wu Den-yih, frequently criticized the KMT-led central government for its bias in favor of the north and against the south.

== Ethnic divisions ==
Historical tensions within Taiwan between ethnic mainlanders and ethnic islanders and their distribution on the island of Taiwan factor into the north–south divide in Taiwan.

=== Taipei ===
Taipei is the single place in Taiwan that has the highest proportion of mainlainder.Mainlanders are those who came to Taiwan from China after Chinese Nationalist Party representing Republic of China's defeat in Chinese Civil War against Chinese Communist Party representing People's Republic of China in 1949. Mainlanders' immediate descendants are called Second-generation mainlanders. Descendants of second-generation mainlanders are called "Third-generation mainlanders", and so on. This is conceptually similar to the x-generation immigrants. Mainlanders often identify themselves as Chinese (nationals of the Republic of China).

==== Tianlongguo ====
Tianlongguo (天龍國; 'Celestial Dragon Country', also Tianlong) is a pejorative term referring to Taipei residents' apparent nobility or aloofness. The term is based on the Celestial Dragon characters in the Japanese manga One Piece.

=== Kaohsiung ===
Demographically, Kaohsiung has mainly consisted of islanders. Islanders have been living in Taiwan long before 1949, including indigenous people and immigrants who came to Taiwan from southeastern China earlier than 1949 approximately in 1620 A.D. Since there have been countless generations, it is not a habit of people in Taiwan to describe an islander as a certain-generation islander. Islanders often identify themselves as Taiwanese.

Kaohsiung has been central to Taiwan's democratic breakthrough.

== "Capital first" ideology ==
Apart from the aforementioned ethnic division, Taiwanese politicians have primarily been dominated by a "capital-first" ideology. This means that all construction projects must have first begun in the capital, and all policies must have first been implemented in the capital before being rolled out to other counties and cities; the capital is expected to play a leading role.

Supporters of the capital first tried to rationalize the ideology by arguing that the capital's quality would influence international perceptions of the Republic of China, or Taiwan; thus, the nation must have invested most of its resources in the capital. Capital-first supporters also think that every aspect of the capital, such as public health and transportation, must be the best in the country.

=== Tainan ===
Just three hundred years ago, Tainan was Taiwan's capital.

== Differences ==
=== Political alignment ===
2012 Taiwanese presidential election results Kuomintang candidate Democratic Progressive Party candidate

Traditionally, southwestern voters have favored Pan-Green parties such as the Democratic Progressive Party (DPP), while northern voters prefer Pan-Blue parties such as the Kuomintang (KMT).

The data of historical elections show a divide between urban versus rural voters, and northern versus southern Taiwanese. For instance, voters from municipalities in northern Taiwan were more inclined to support same-sex marriage legalization. Among the top ten cities in favor of same-sex marriage were the far northern cities of Taipei, New Taipei, Hsinchu, and Keelung.

=== Landform ===
Northern Taiwan accounts for just about 20% of the total area of Taiwan but hosts virtually half of Taiwanese population, implying Taiwanese people are disproportionately concentrated in northern Taiwan, leading to problems of overpopulation and slow growth of regions other than northern Taiwan.

An article published in a demographic and land economics journal by National Chengchi University suggested that the reasons for the high housing prices in the northern region are mainly due to the government's long-standing economic policy of favoring the north over the south, the high concentration of population in metropolitan areas, and the scarcity of major construction projects providing employment opportunities in the south. The article argues that this has led people to pursue real estate in an area of land with limited supply due to geographic reasons, as there is more mountain, high land, and Table (landform) than plain in the northern part of Taiwan.

=== Population ===
As people in Taiwan have continued to migrate to northern Taiwan, the number of seats in the Legislative Yuan representing northern Taiwanese has risen, leading some DPP lawmakers to worry about the unequal pace of development between the more urbanized north and the rural south.

=== Life expectancy ===
Residents in the northern part of Taiwan generally live longer than those in the south. Hsinchu and Taipei areas enjoyed highest life expectancy over the average of 80 years old.

Tainan and Kaohsiung, two major cities in southern Taiwan, had average life expectancy below 80 years old while other major cities in central Taiwan and northern Taiwan such as Taichung, Taoyuan, New Taipei, Taipei, Hsinchu all had the average life expectancy above 80. This is thought to result from disparities in factors like access to medical resources, quality of life, personal fitness and others.

According to the scholars' statistics, there are 12 medical schools in Taiwan as of 2019 and over one-half of them are located in northern Taipei, implying that medical services and education available in Taiwan are disproportionately concentrated in northern Taiwan. In 2018, of the 400 physicians graduating per year, only 32 of them opted to work in Kaohsiung. This exposed a severe inequality in medical service capacity between northern and southern Taiwan. "The central government hasn't even hosted any public-funded medical school across Kaohsiung, Pingtung, Penghu and Taitung yet!", said the dean of National Sun Yat-sen University in 2019.

According to Journal of Thoracic Oncology, the occurrence of lung cancer in southern Taiwan has increased at a rate 15 times greater than that of northern Taiwan, which contributes to southern Taiwan's shorter life expectancy.

=== Education opportunity ===
Over half of the enrollees of National Taiwan University come from Taipei City and New Taipei City.

== See also ==
- Global North and Global South
- Northern and southern China
