= Native Taiwanese =

Native Taiwanese may refer to:

- Benshengren, Han people who settled in Taiwan prior to 1945
- Taiwanese indigenous peoples, Austronesian peoples native to Taiwan
