= Chang Kuang-bin =

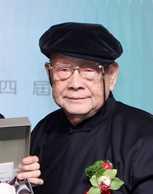
Image of Chang Guang-bin

Chang Kuang-bin (1915–2016), with the courtesy name Xuxian and the pseudonym Yuhuan, was born in Sichuan, China. He was a calligrapher and painter from Taiwan who specialized in studying the calligraphy and painting of the Yuan Dynasty. He created techniques such as "scattered-dot cun" and "ordered-dot cun" using burnt ink. He authored several books on calligraphy and painting, covering the fields of calligraphy and painting history, theory, and education. He devoted himself to promoting the education of calligraphy and painting.

== Life ==
Born in Sichuan in 1915, Chang Kuang-bin graduated from the three-year national painting program at the National Art School in 1945. He studied under famous calligraphy and painting masters such as Fu Baoshi, Li Keran, and Huang Chun-pi. In 1969, he became a researcher at Department of Painting, Calligraphy, Rare Books, and Documents of the National Palace Museum in Taipei, specializing in studying the calligraphy and painting of the Yuan Dynasty. In the 1970s, Chang engaged in a heated debate with scholar Xu Fuguan over the authenticity of Huang Gongwang's "Dwelling in the Fuchun Mountains" scroll, and established a viewpoint widely accepted in the academic community by focusing on local historical records. After retiring from the National Palace Museum in 1987, Chang taught calligraphy and painting at universities and continued to innovate in his artistic creations. He developed techniques such as "scattered-dot cun" and "ordered-dot cun" with burnt ink, which replaced the traditional layering and rendering techniques with a single layer of ink dots. He also collaborated with contemporary new media digital artists to explore new perspectives in contemporary ink art. Chang died in Taipei on May 19, 2016, at the age of 102.

== Honors and awards ==
In 2015, Chang was awarded the Second Class of the Order of Brilliant Star. The award ceremony was held on November 19 at the Tri-Service General Hospital in Taipei's Dingzhou campus.

In 2010, Chang was also awarded the National Cultural and Arts Foundation's National Award for Arts, as well as the Executive Yuan's Cultural Award for the 29th edition.

== Works and collections ==
• Chang Kuang-bin (ed.). "History of Chinese Calligraphy". Taipei: Taiwan Commercial Press. October 1989. ISBN 978-957-05-0045-5.

• Chang Kuang-bin. "Chang Kuang-bin's Calligraphy and Painting Collection". New Taipei City: Yi-Yen-Tang Design. December 2003. ISBN 978-957-29309-1-5.

• Chang Kuang-bin. "Three Hundred Tang Poems in Cursive Script". Taipei City: Hui-Feng Tang. October 2008. ISBN 978-986-7678-85-0.

• Chang Kuang-bin. "Reading and Talking about Painting: Twenty Years of Walking in the National Palace Museum, Taipei". Taipei: Lishan Yulu. October 2008. ISBN 978-986-84758-0-9.

• Chang Kuang-bin. "Late Afternoon and Leisure: Chang Kuang-bin's Painting and Calligraphy Exhibition After Ninety". Taipei: Sun Yat-sen Memorial Hall. January 2010. ISBN 978-986-02-2497-9.

• Chang Kuang-bin. "Chronology of the Four Great Yuan Masters". Taipei City: Graduate Institute of Art History, National Taiwan University. March 2010. ISBN 978-986-02-1965-4.

• Chang Kuang-bin. "Century Collection of Chang Kuang-bin's Painting and Calligraphy Exhibition: Life is Like a Dream, Splendid as Brocade". Taipei City: Chinese Culture Association. December 2012. ISBN 978-986-6573-31-6.

• Chang Kuang-bin. "Chang Kuang-bin's Running Script: The Lyrics of Su Shi". Taipei City: Lishan Yulu. May 2013. ISBN 978-986-84758-1-6.

• Chang Kuang-bin. "Plain and Ordinary: Chang Kuang-bin's Centenary Painting and Calligraphy Collection". Taipei City: Lishan Yulu. September 2014. ISBN 978-986-84758-2-3.

• Chang Kuang-bin. "Chang Kuang-bin's Sketchbook Collection". Taipei City: Zhi Busu Studio. September 2016. ISBN 978-986-93698-0-0.

== Biography ==
• Tsai, Yao-ching (主訪編撰); National Museum of History Editorial Committee (編輯委員會編輯). Chang, Guang-bin: The Running Script and Dot-Stroke Painting (張光賓：筆華墨雨) (in Chinese). Taipei: National Museum of History. 2007-12. ISBN 978-986-01-2672-3
