= Huang Chun-pi =

Chinese painter (1898–1991)

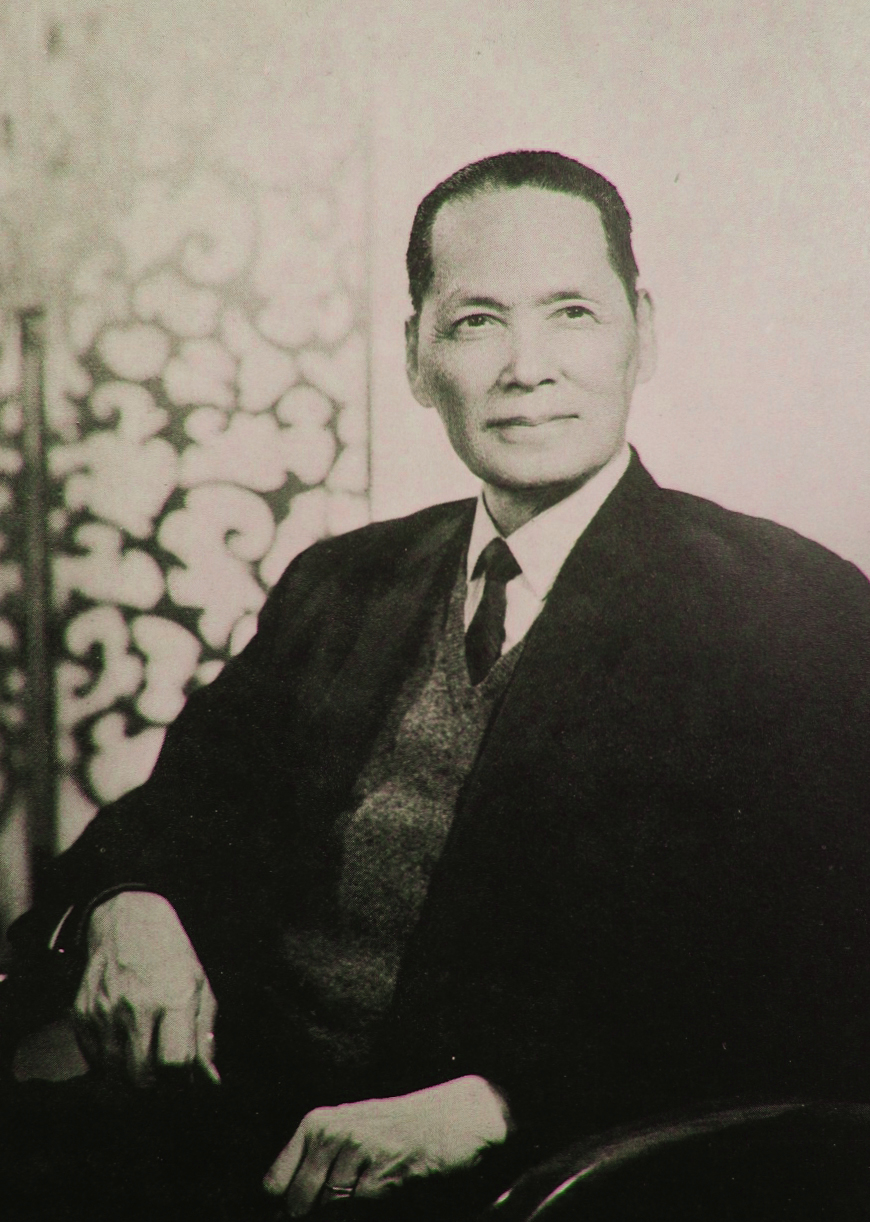
Huang Chun-pi

Huang Chun-pi (Chinese:黃君璧, November 12, 1898 – October 29, 1991), born Yunzi (韞之), originally named Yunxuan (允瑄), also known as Chunpi, Junweng (君翁), and later respectfully addressed as Elderly Mi Shou (米壽老人), was a Chinese ink painter and educator born in Luchow, Guangdong, China. After 1949, he moved to Taiwan, becoming part of the trio known as the "Three Masters Crossing the Strait (渡海三家)" alongside Chang Dai-chien (張大千) and Pu Xinyu (溥心畬).

== Early life and education ==
Born in Guangzhou in 1898 (24th year of the Guangxu reign,光緒24年), Huang came from a family with a long history of business. His father, an avid collector of antiques and calligraphy known as Yang Xun Gong (仰荀公), had a profound influence on Huang's artistic development.

He began his education in a private school at a young age and, in 1914, entered the Art Department of Guangdong Public School, where he received instruction from Li Yaoping (李瑤屏) and learned both Eastern and Western painting techniques. After graduating in 1919, Huang continued his studies with Li Yaoping, focusing on the appreciation and imitation of ancient paintings. In 1922, Huang Chun-pi joined the Chu Ting Art Institute (楚庭畫院) to study Western painting, winning first place in the Guangdong Provincial Art Exhibition that same year, marking the beginning of his career as an ink painter and educator. He completed his studies at the Chu Ting Art Institute in 1923, recommended by Li Yaoping, and began teaching at Peizheng Middle School in Guangzhou (廣州培正中學).

== Career ==
From 1927 to 1936, he served as the Director of Education at the Guangzhou Municipal School of Fine Arts (廣州市立美術專科學校). In 1937, under the leadership of Xu Beihong (徐悲鴻), he became a professor in the Department of Fine Arts at the National Central University, where he taught for 11 years. Before moving to Taiwan, Huang Chun-pi traveled extensively throughout China, sketching landscapes in places such as Guilin, Nanjing, Sichuan, the Jialing River, and Mount Hua. These observations and sketches contributed to the evolution of his painting techniques and style.

=== Taiwan period ===
In 1949, Huang Chun-pi moved to Taiwan, succeeding Mo Dayuan (莫大元) as a professor and the second director of the Art Department at National Taiwan Normal College (now National Taiwan Normal University, 國立臺灣師範大學). He retired in 1971. During his time at National Taiwan Normal College, Huang also taught in his private studio, "Bai Yun Tang (白雲堂)." Additionally, he served as the personal ink painting teacher for Soong Mei-ling (宋美齡), the wife of Chiang Kai-shek (蔣介石). Outside of his teaching duties, Huang Chun-pi also explored various scenic spots in Taiwan, including Wulai, Alishan, and Xitou. In 1969, he personally visited three of the world's largest waterfalls – Victoria Falls, Iguazu Falls, and Niagara Falls. Through methods such as car rides, boat trips, and plane rides, he observed the various forms of waterfalls. Upon returning to Taiwan, he transformed his observations into artworks, which were exhibited at the Provincial Museum (now the National Taiwan Museum) in December of the same year. Huang Chun-pi's brushwork depicted the dynamic flow of waterfalls, developing techniques such as the " v-shaped lines (倒人字法、V字法)," and "shaking brush work (抖筆法)" to portray waterfalls.

Apart from holding exhibitions in Taiwan, Huang Chun-pi, in 1957, was dispatched by the Ministry of Education to Europe and the United States to study art education, tour famous landscapes, sketch, hold exhibitions, and give lectures. In 1968, he received the Academic Excellence Medal from St. John's University in New York City. Huang Chun-pi traveled to Asia, Europe, America, and Africa, making significant contributions to the promotion of cultural and artistic exchanges. He received notable awards, including the first "Chinese Literary and Artistic Award for Fine Arts" from the Ministry of Education (1955), the "Literary and Artistic Award Medal" from the Chinese Literary and Artistic Association (1984), the "National Literary and Artistic Special Contribution Award" from the Council for Cultural Affairs, Executive Yuan (1984), and a plaque reading "Master of the Art World" presented by the art community in 1967.
