= Waishengren =

Mainland Chinese migrants to Taiwan

臺灣外省人
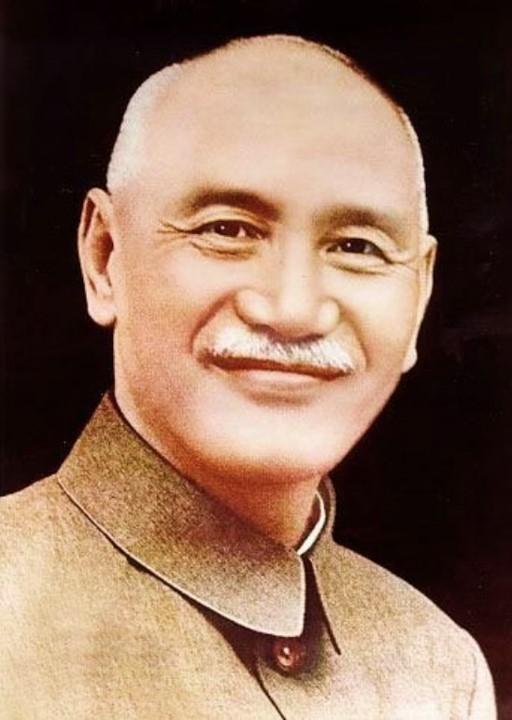
Chiang Kai-shek

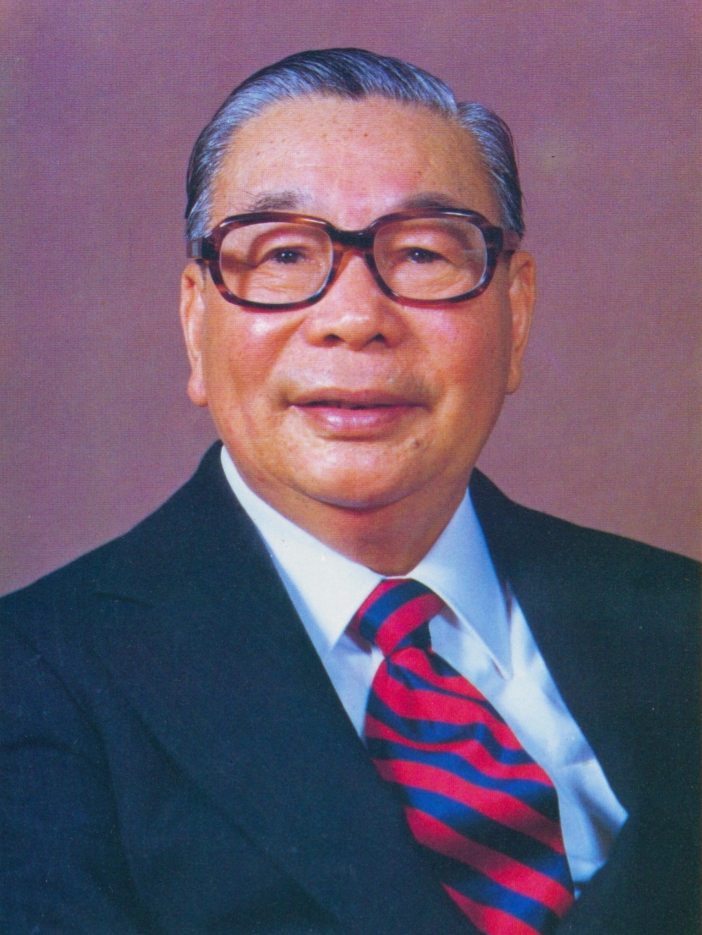
Chiang Ching-kuo

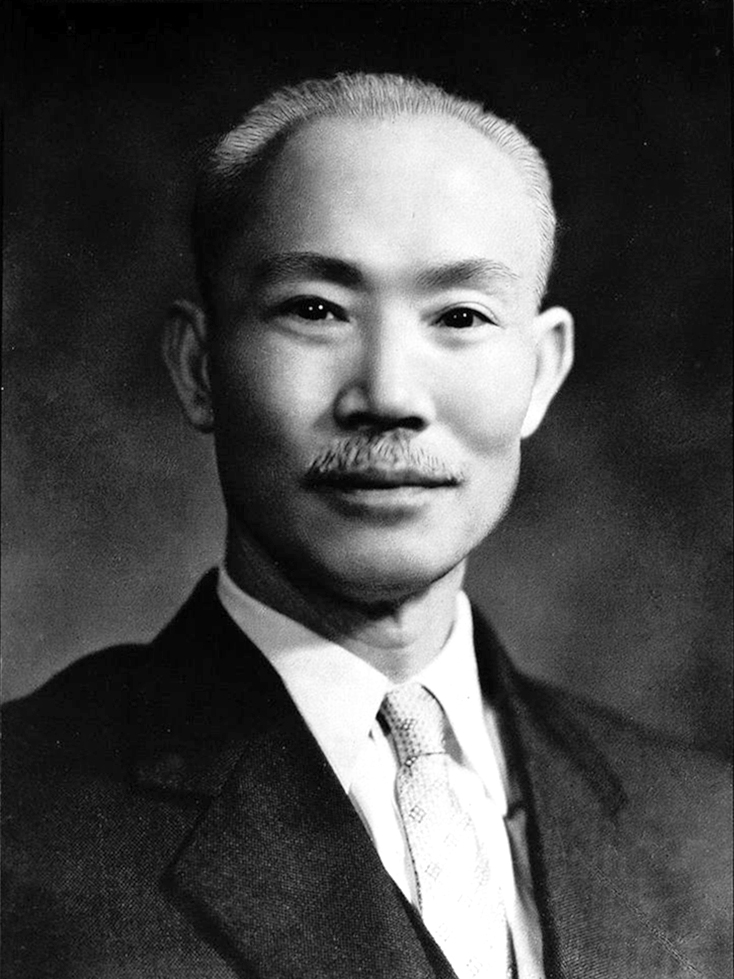
Chen Cheng

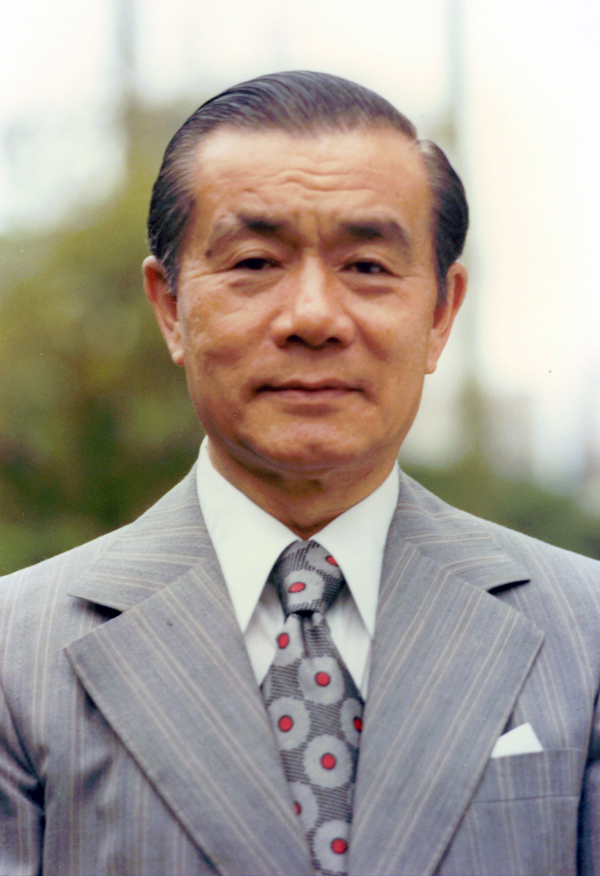
Sun Yun-suan

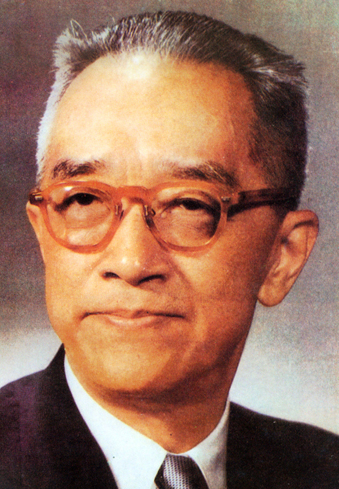
Hu Shih

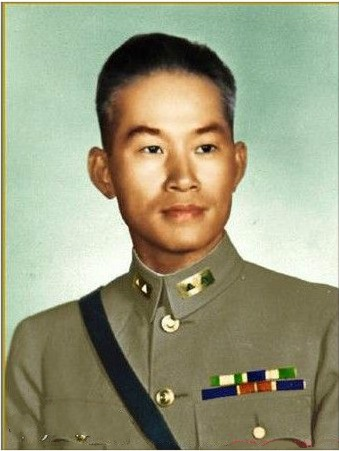
Sun Li-jen

Fu Ssu-nien

Lei Chen

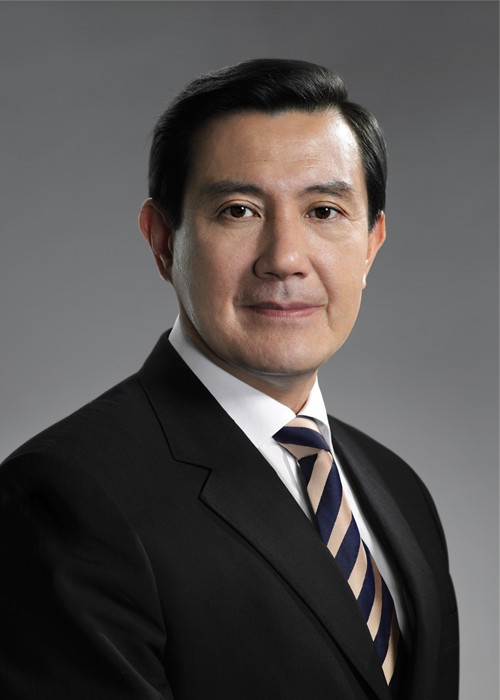
Ma Ying-jeou

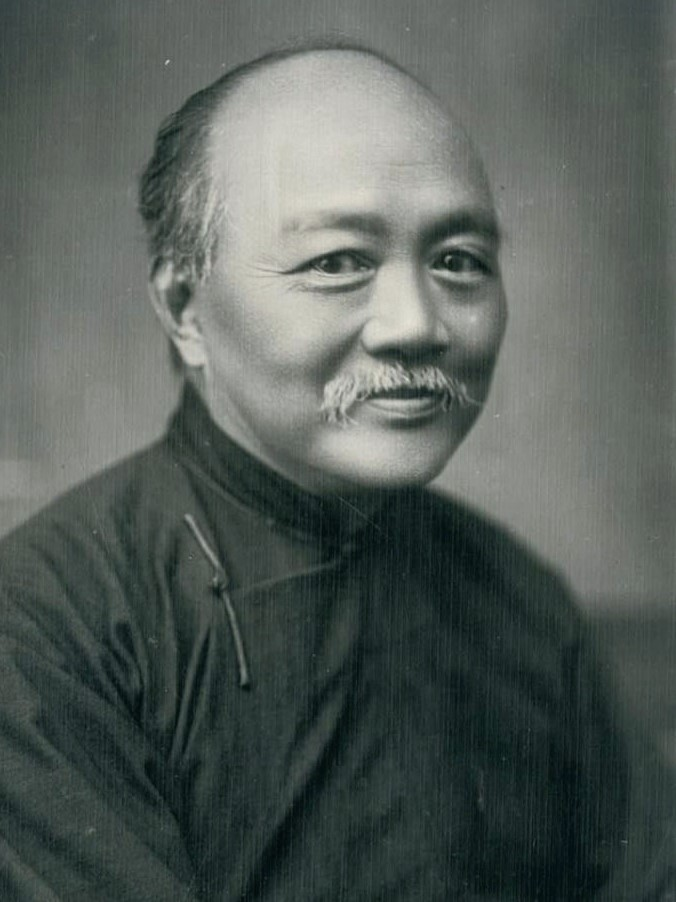
Wu Zhihui

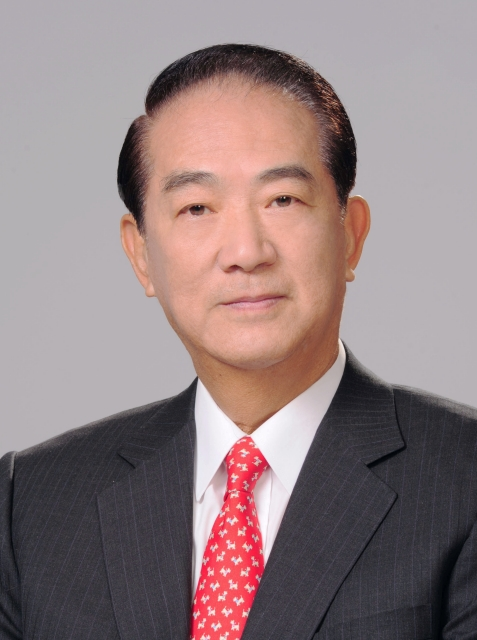
Soong Chu-yu

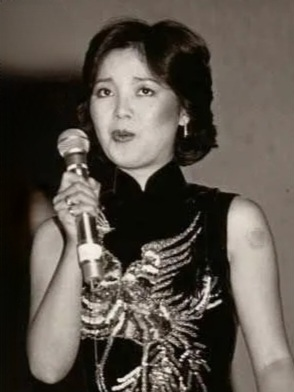
Teresa Teng

Hou Hsiao-hsien

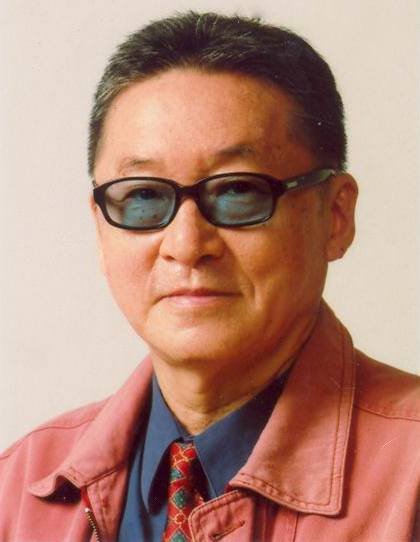
Li Ao

Pai Hsien-yung

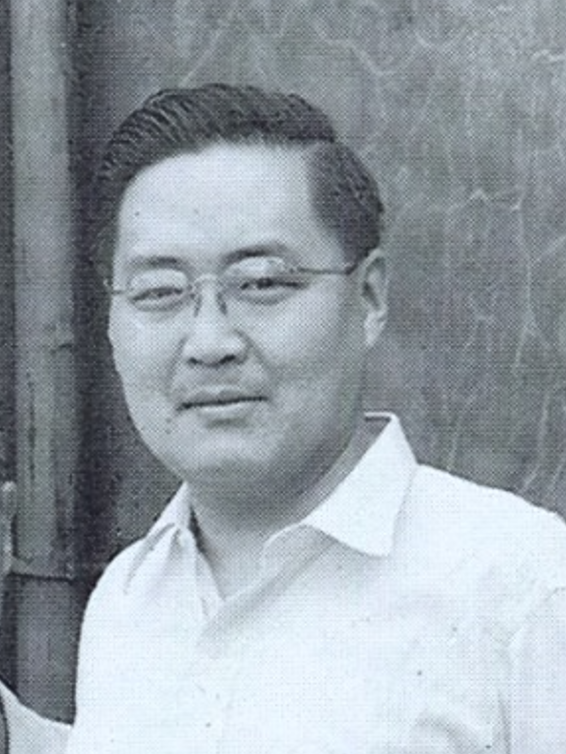
Kung Te-cheng

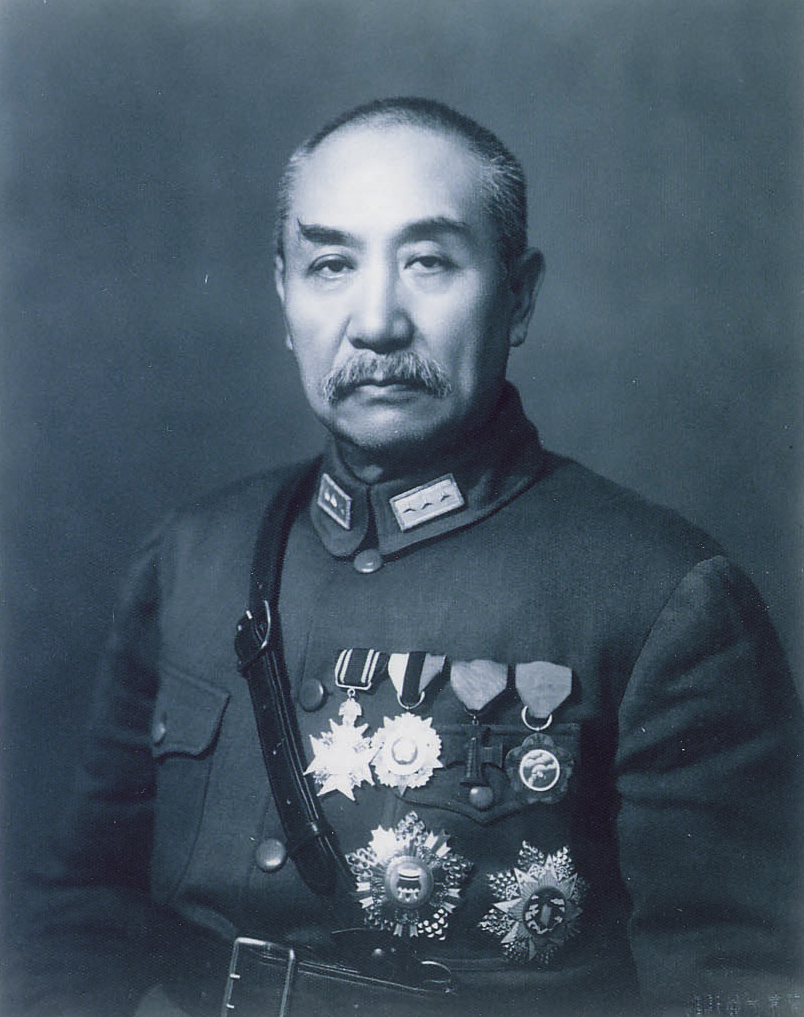
Yan Xishan

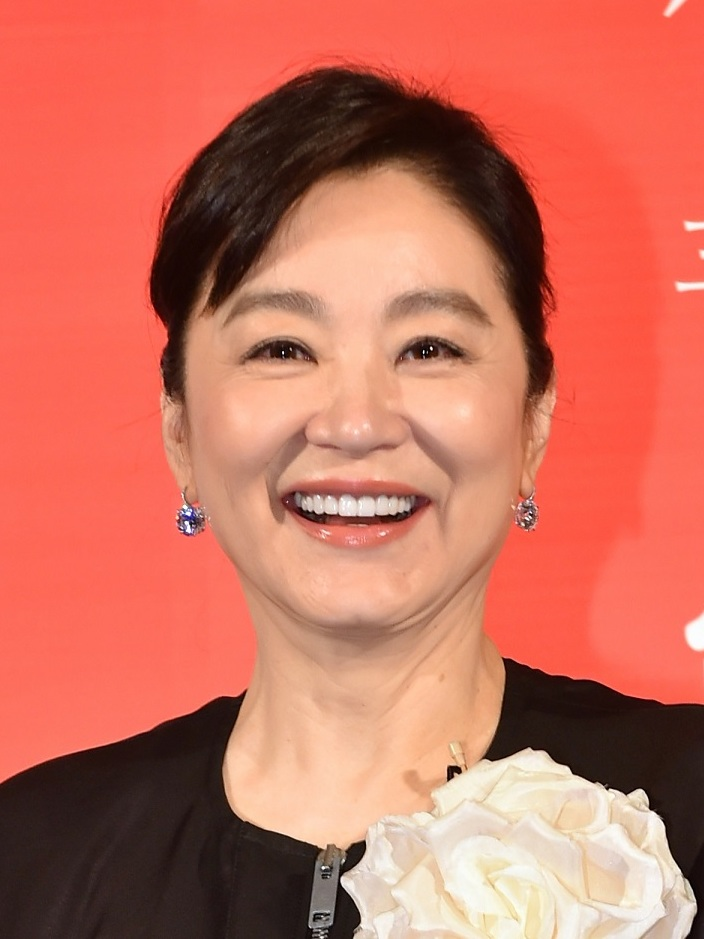
Brigitte Lin

Chang Dai-chien

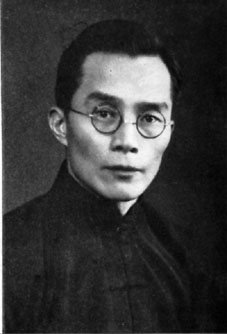
Mei Yiqi

Total population
- 13% of Taiwan's total population (1990 census)

Languages
- Taiwanese Mandarin, Chinese dialects, Languages of other ethnic groups in China

Religion
- Traditional Buddhism, Taoism, Confucianism, Chinese folk religion Protestantism, Catholicism, Islam

Related ethnic groups
- Chinese, Hoklo Taiwanese, Hakka Taiwanese, Han Taiwanese

Waishengren, (Note: pinyin: wàishěngrén; Tâi-lô: guā-síng-lâng; Chinese: 外省人; Pe̍h-ōe-jī: goā-séng-lâng; lit. 'People from outside of (Taiwan) province') formerly called mainlanders, refers to Republic of China (ROC) nationals who migrated from mainland China to Taiwan between 1945—when the Republic of China took over Taiwan from Japan at the end of World War II—to 1949, when the ROC government retreated to Taiwan in the final stages of the Chinese Civil War. The group also includes people who migrated to Taiwan before the resumption of cross-strait visits in the 1980s. They came from various regions of mainland China and spanned multiple social classes. Their ethnicities include not only the majority Han Chinese people, but also minority groups such as Manchus, Hui, or Mongols.

The term is complementary to the group of benshengren, (Note: Chinese: 本省人; pinyin: bénshěngrén; Tâi-lô: pún-síng-lâng; Pe̍h-ōe-jī: pún-séng-lâng; lit. 'People native to (Taiwan) province') which refers to Hoklo and Hakka peoples who had lived through the period of Japanese rule before the ROC assumed control of Taiwan. Although the descendants of the first generation migrants may still be labeled as Waishengren, as the intermarriages become increasingly common, the distinction between those two groups has been less clear-cut. Waishengren group excludes Chinese immigrants with the People’s Republic of China citizenship, and other ethnic Chinese immigrants with foreign nationalities, such as from Malaysia, Singapore or British Hong Kong.

== Definition ==
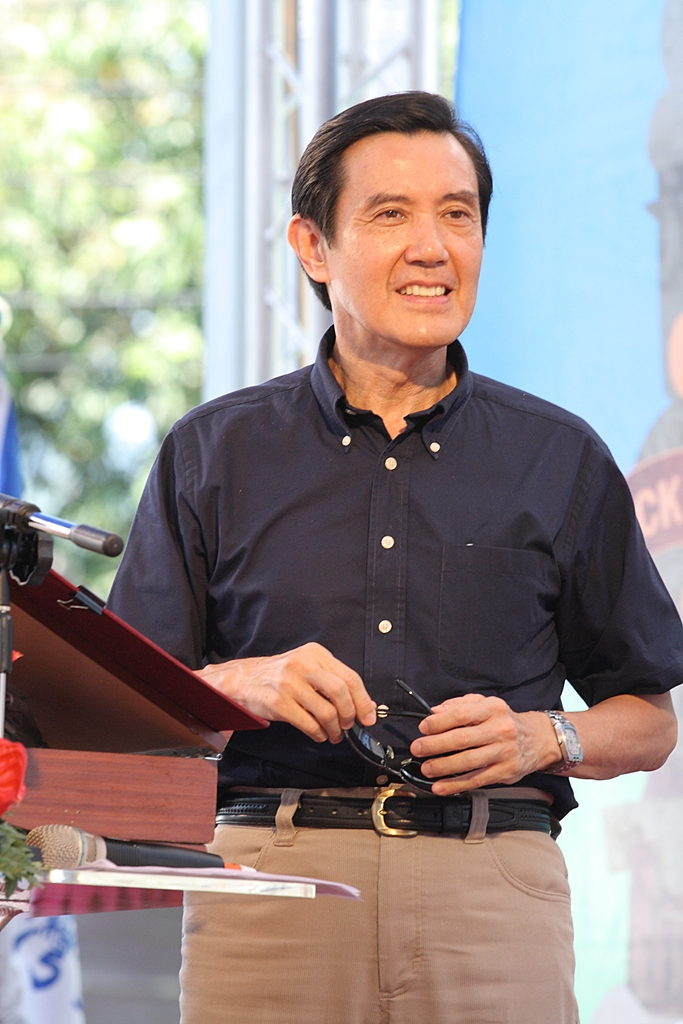
Former ROC President Ma Ying-jeou is often regarded as a waishengren, though he grew up in Taipei since the age of 2.

The formal definition of a waishengren (Note: Chinese: 外省人; pinyin: wàishěngrén; Tâi-lô: guā-síng-lâng; Pe̍h-ōe-jī: goā-séng-lâng) was someone living in Taiwan whose ancestral home, which is passed down through one's father, was not in Taiwan. By contrast, a benshengren (Note: Chinese: 本省人; pinyin: bénshěngrén; Tâi-lô: pún-síng-lâng; Pe̍h-ōe-jī: pún-séng-lâng) was someone whose ancestral home was Taiwan. By this formal definition, a person born in Taiwan whose father's ancestral home is not in Taiwan is considered a waishengren.

Conversely, a person not born in Taiwan whose ancestral home is Taiwan (most notably Lien Chan) is considered a benshengren. Ancestral homes were eliminated in official records (e.g. on identity cards, household registrations, and passports) in 1996, and replaced with place of birth, which ended the official distinction of waishengren versus benshengren since many waishengren were born in Taiwan.

Today, in practice the term broadly refers to the cultural group of people who migrated from mainland China to Taiwan starting in 1945 when the Republic of China took control of Taiwan after the Surrender of Japan at the conclusion of World War II, and into the 1950s during the retreat of the Republic of China to Taiwan and its aftermath. Recent immigrants to Taiwan from China are not considered waishengren, but make up a separate social category. Due to significant intermarriage between waishengren and benshengren families, it is difficult to precisely define the distinction in later generations.

=== Translations ===
The terms waishengren and benshengren pose some difficulties in translation; most academic literature uses them directly. The literal translation of waishengren is "extra-provincial people" while the literal translation of benshengren is "this-province people"; however, these translations are politically loaded since they arose in a historical context when the ruling Kuomintang actively claimed the entirety of China.

One English translation of waishengren is "mainlander", although some waishengren find this translation uncomfortable since many of them have lived in Taiwan their entire lives and the term may lead to confusion with residents of the People's Republic of China. Likewise, translating benshengren as "native Taiwanese" may cause confusion with Taiwanese indigenous peoples.

== Demographics ==
Due to the chaotic nature of the Kuomintang retreat to Taiwan, the exact number of waishengren is unknown. Estimates vary regarding how many waishengren migrated, with most estimates ranging between 950,000 and 2 million, with 1.2 million being the most commonly cited figure in Taiwan. Newly declassified archival data yielded a population of 1,024,233 mainland Chinese immigrants in Taiwan and the Kinmen-Matsu military zones on September 16, 1956. Furthermore, the male to female ratio among the immigrants was 375:100.

There are several subgroups of waishengren based on how they migrated. About 26% of non-military waishengren arrived prior to the KMT military retreat. This group consisted of elites, e.g. government officials, businessmen and intellectuals, as well as migrant workers from Fujian. Another significant category consisted of military personnel and their families, as well as soldiers who were press ganged or forcibly conscripted by the Kuomintang. Another category consists of refugees, who were hastily evacuated during the Kuomintang retreat. Some others, such as Ma Ying-jeou, arrived in the years after the retreat, for example through Hong Kong.

About 40% of waishengren settled in the Taipei area, with another 25% settling in Kaohsiung, Keelung, Taichung and Tainan.

== History ==
Historically, waishengren elites dominated the government hierarchy during the martial law era on Taiwan. The continued influx of waishengren migrants along with the corruption that occurred under Chen Yi's military government immediately following the Japanese surrender in 1945 caused inflation and economic inequality between the waishengren elites and native benshengren. This along with the subsequent 228 Incident, which resulted in the murder of several thousand Taiwanese civilians, generated resentment among benshengren and resulted in benshengren excluding waishengren from their social spheres. This exclusion often came in the form of preventing waishengren from using local facilities and purchasing from Taiwanese shops through acts of discrimination. This resentment also influenced the creation of a strong national Taiwanese identity, which eventually led to the Taiwanese Independence Movement in the 1990s. Although no longer dominating the government, waishengren elites still make up a large fraction of bureaucrats and military officers.

On the other hand, many of the soldiers and refugees who arrived with the Kuomintang came without their families. Finding themselves destitute in an alien land with no relatives, some of them turned to violent crime or suicide. In the late 50s, waishengren crime rates were more than that of benshengren, and would not fall to benshengren levels until the 70s. Likewise, suicide rates for waishengren were double that of benshengren during the 50s. Violent crimes committed by waishengren vagrants caused fear and anger in the local benshengren, and the government often used public executions to assuage the public, especially in extreme and publicized cases such as armed robbery, sexual harassment, or murder. The influx of poor waishengren also put enormous pressure on housing, and resulted in the illegal construction of a large number of shantytowns in Taipei. On the other hand, waishengren elites with political connections could often obtain formerly Japanese-owned properties, sometimes at the expense of evicted benshengren who already lived there.

Starting in the 1970s, Chinese nationalist dominance of the government began to recede. This was due to a lack of a political or social theory that would justify continued Chinese nationalist dominance, meritocratic policies which allowed local Taiwanese to move up in the government, political establishment encouraged under the Chiang government, and economic prosperity which allowed for social mobility for those outside of the political establishment.

Intermarriage and a new generation raised under the same environment has largely blurred the distinction between waishengren and benshengren. Many benshengren women married waishengren, often retired military personnel who came as singles.

In the late 1990s, the concept of "the New Taiwanese" became popular both among supporters of Taiwan independence and Chinese unification in order to advocate a more tolerant proposition that waishengren, who sided with the Allies against the reluctant Japanese colony in Taiwan during World War II, are no less Taiwanese than benshengren. However it quickly became apparent that the notion of New Taiwanese meant different things to supporters of independence and unification. To supporters of independence, the concept of New Taiwanese implied that waishengren should assimilate into a Taiwanese identity which was separate from the Chinese one. By contrast, the supporters of Chinese unification seemed to believe that all Taiwanese (not just waishengren) should restore a previously marginalized Taiwanese identity without antagonizing a larger pan-Chinese identity.

== See also ==
- Demographics of Taiwan
- Benshengren
- North–South divide in Taiwan
- Mainland Chinese
