= Northern and southern China =

Two approximate mega-regions within China

The January average 0°C isotherm (average January temperatures in China). Blue signifies below 0 °C (32 °F) and red above 0 °C

Northern China (Chinese: 中国北方 or 中国北部; lit. 'China's North') and southern China (Chinese: 中国南方 or 中国南部; lit. 'China's South') (Note: Also referred to in China as simply the north (Chinese: 北方; pinyin: Běifāng) and the south (Chinese: 南方; pinyin: Nánfāng).) are two approximate regions that display certain differences in terms of their geography, demographics, economy, and culture.

== Extent ==
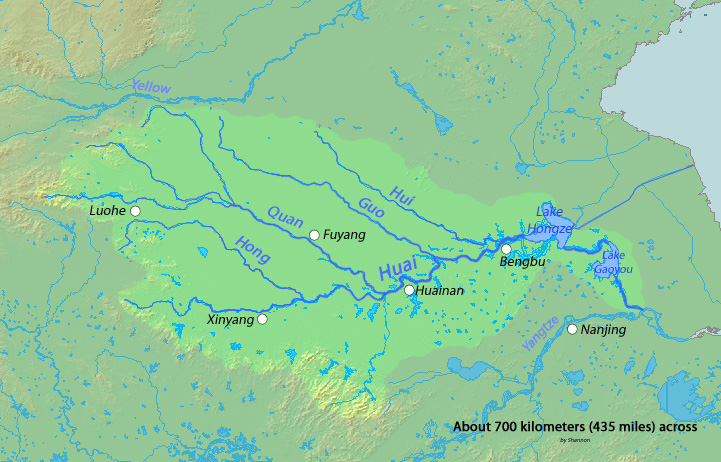
The Huai River basin showing tributaries and major settlements

The Qinling–Daba Mountains serve as the transition zone between northern and southern China. They approximately coincide with the 0 degree Celsius isotherm in January, the 800 millimetres (31 in) isohyet, and the 2,000-hour isohel. The Huai River basin serves a similar role, and the course of the Huaihe has been used to set different policies to the north and the south.

== History ==
Historically, populations migrated from the north to the south, especially its coastal areas and along major rivers.

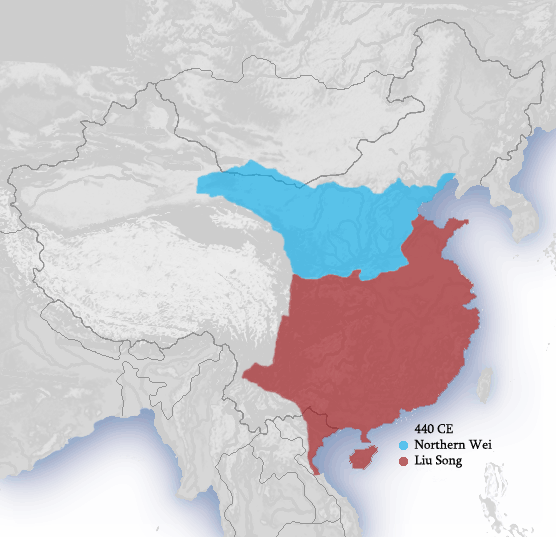
Confrontation between Northern Wei and Liu Song during the Northern and Southern dynasties

After the fall of the Han dynasty, the Southern and Northern Dynasties (420–589) ruled their respective part of China before re-uniting under the Sui dynasty.

During the Qing dynasty, regional differences and identification in China fostered the growth of regional stereotypes. Such stereotypes often appeared in historic chronicles and gazetteers and were based on geographic circumstances, historical and literary associations (e.g. people from Shandong, were considered upright and honest) and Chinese cosmology (as the south was associated with the fire element, Southerners were considered hot-tempered). These differences were reflected in Qing dynasty policies, such as the prohibition on local officials to serve their home areas, as well as conduct of personal and commercial relations. In 1730, the Kangxi Emperor made the observation in the Tingxun Geyan (庭訓格言):

The people of the North are strong; they must not copy the fancy diets of the Southerners, who are physically frail, live in a different environment, and have different stomachs and bowels.

— the Kangxi Emperor, Tingxun Geyan (《庭訓格言》)

During the Republican period, Lu Xun, a major Chinese writer, wrote:

According to my observation, Northerners are sincere and honest; Southerners are skilled and quick-minded. These are their respective virtues. Yet sincerity and honesty lead to stupidity, whereas skillfulness and quick-mindedness lead to duplicity.

— Lu Xun, Complete works of Lu Xun (《魯迅全集》), pp. 493–495.

== Today ==
=== Climate ===
Northern regions of China have long winters that are cold and dry, often below freezing, and long summers that are hot and humid. Transitional periods are short. The ecology is simple and not resilient to droughts.

Many southern regions are subtropical and green year round. The winters are short. They often experience typhoons and the East Asian monsoon in the summer. The ecology is complex, and floods are more common.

=== Diet and produce ===
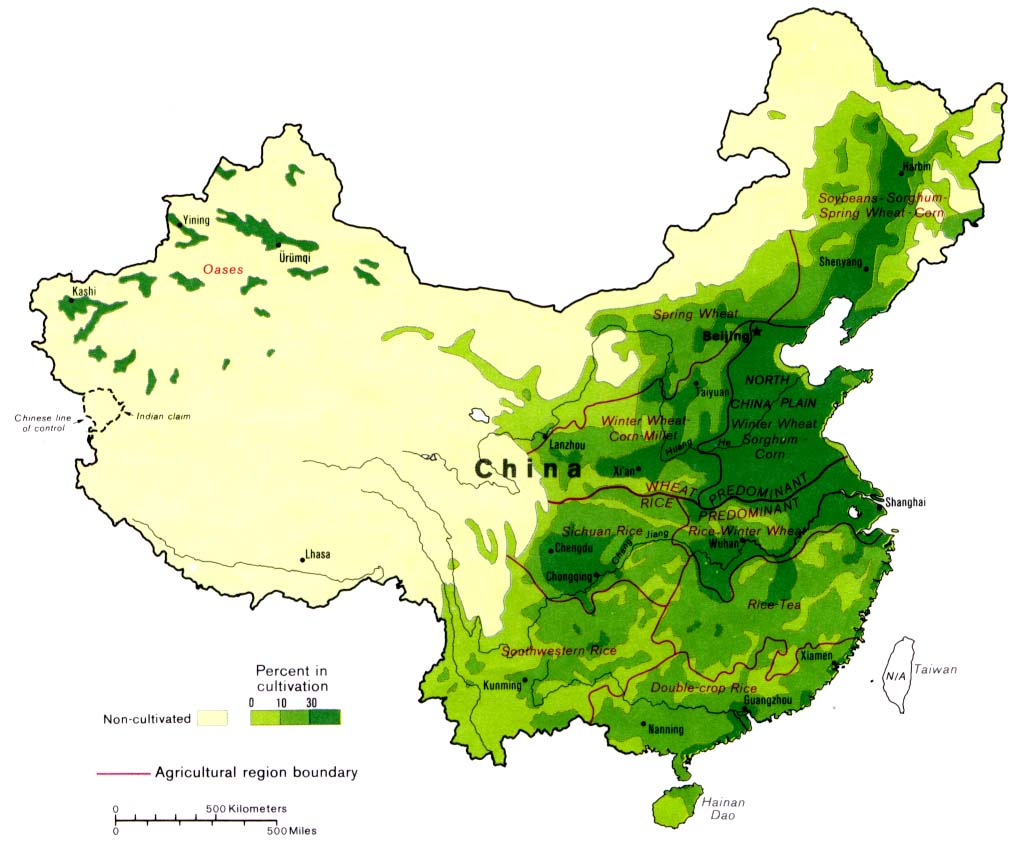
Northern regions often cultivate wheat, while rice is more prevalent in the south

The northern regions are easier to cultivate. Hardy crops such as corn, sorghum, soybeans, and wheat are grown, and one to two crops are produced each year. The growing season lasts four to six months. Wheat-based food such as bread, dumplings, and noodles are more common.

Cultivation of the southern regions began later in history. Warm temperatures and abundant rainfall help produce rice and tropical fruits. Two to three crops can be grown each year, and the growing season lasts nine to twelve months. Rice-based food is more common.

=== Language and people ===
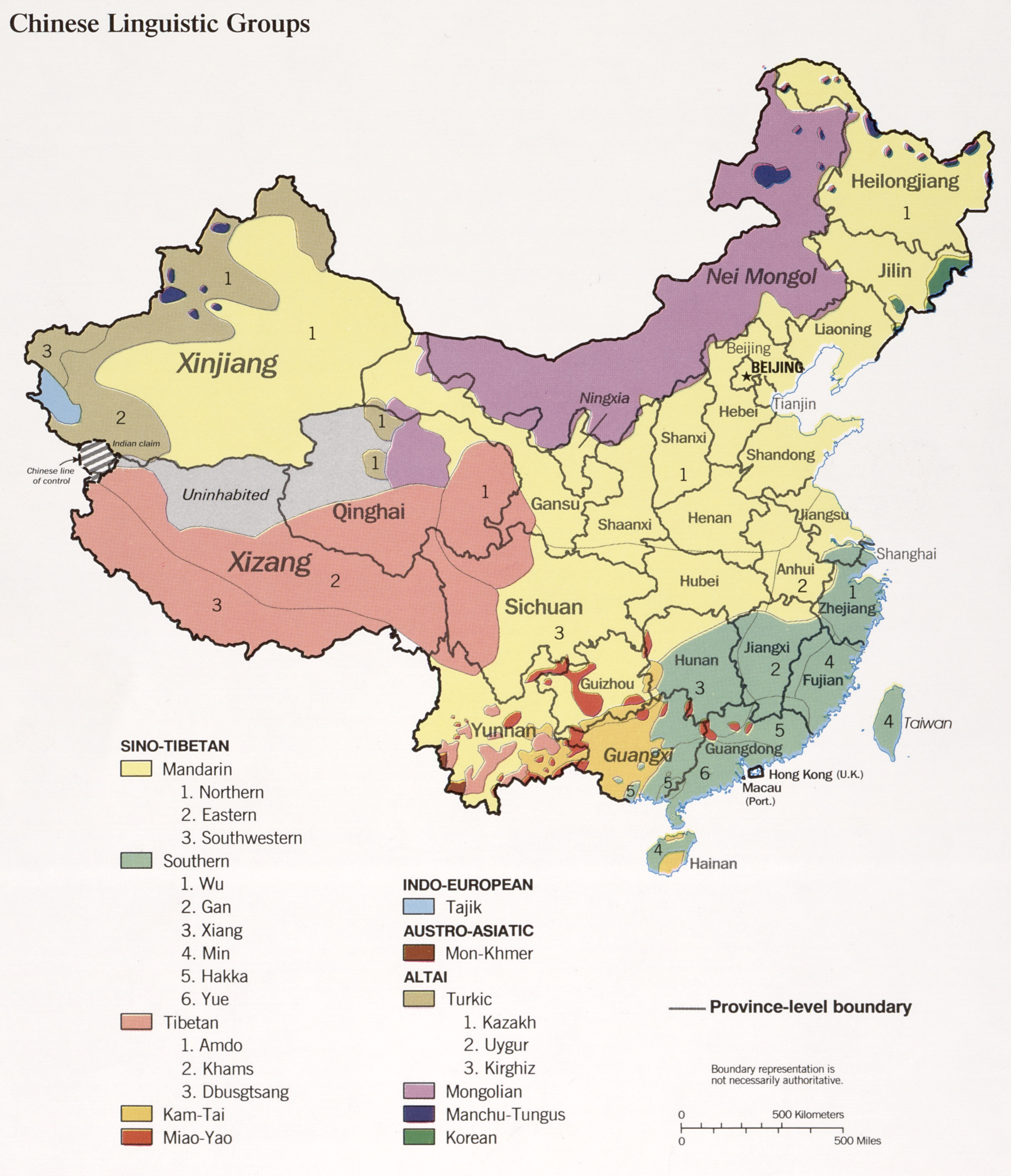
Northern regions are predominantly Mandarin-speaking, while southern regions speak southwestern Mandarin, Eastern Mandarin, and non-Mandarin. ("Mandarin" and "Southern" on this map refer to Sinitic languages, while other groups are not Sinitic.) (Note: The map shows the distribution of linguistic groups according to historical majority ethnic groups, which may have shifted due to prolonged internal migration and assimilation.)

Jones Lamprey, a British army surgeon in 1868, writes that northerners have lighter skin tones than southerners, although the shade can change greatly from season to season depending on an individual's exposure to sunlight when performing manual labor outdoors. Northerners are often taller than southerners.

Variants of Mandarin are widely spoken in northern regions and often with a rhotic accent. Ethnic groups are comparatively more diverse in southern regions. Rhotic accent is usually absent from the Mandarin spoken there. Different dialects are less mutually intelligible, and additional languages such as Cantonese or Hokkien are spoken. Patrilineage organizations are larger and more integrated in rural southern regions, possibly due to merges and competition for territory.

A series of studies on regional differences in China suggest that people from places that grow wheat have different social styles and thought styles from those in rice-growing regions. Respondents from northern China are found to be more individualistic, think more analytically, and more open to strangers. Those from the southern regions are more likely to think holistically, interdependent, and draw a larger distinction between friends and strangers. The difference was attributed to the growing of rice, which often requires the sharing labor and managing shared irrigation infrastructure.

=== Transportation ===
Traveling between places tends to be easier in northern regions where the terrain is more even.

=== Economy ===
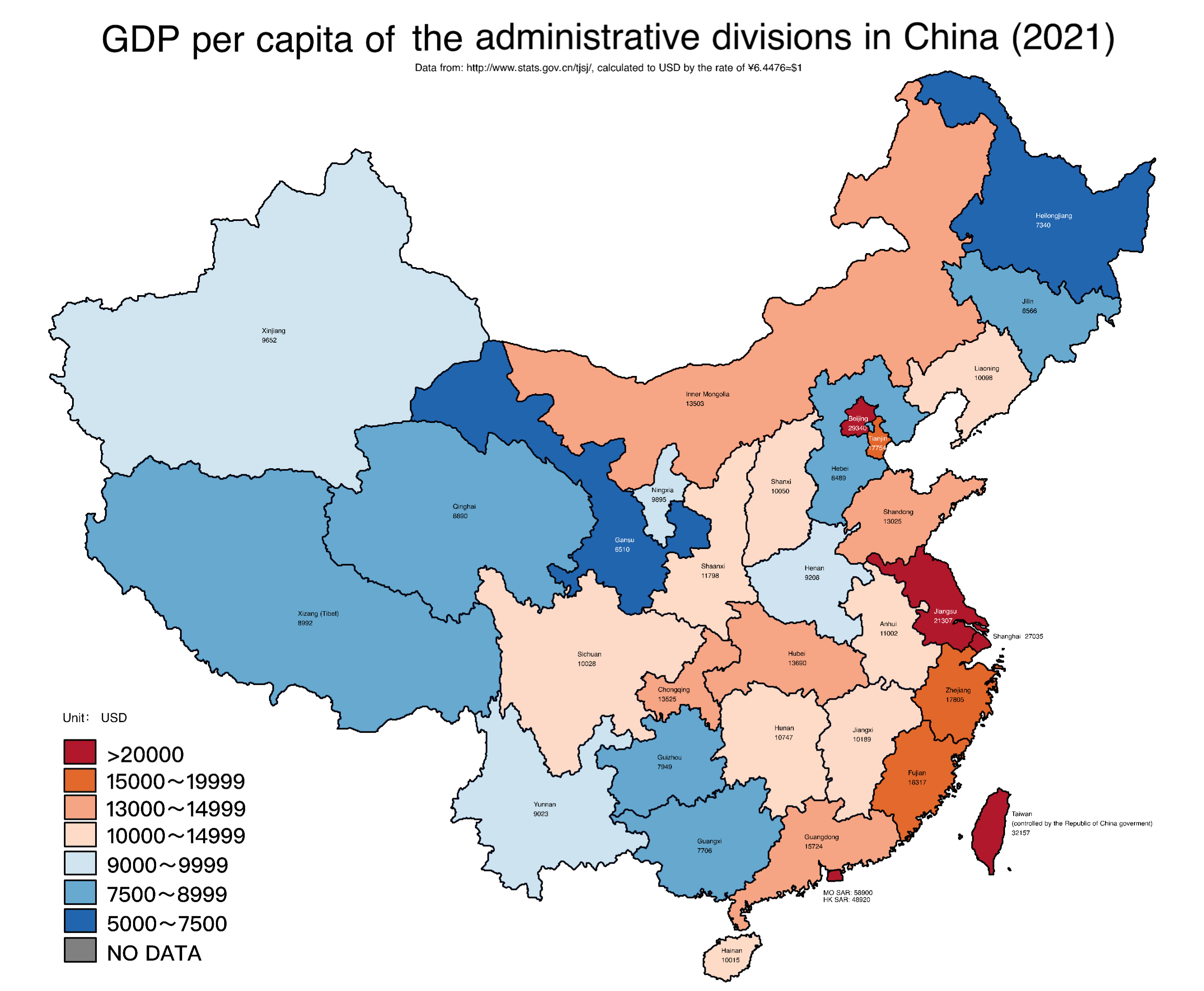
GDP per capita in 2021. The disparity in terms of wealth runs in the east–west direction rather than the north–south direction. However, the southeast coast is still wealthier than the northeast coast in per capita terms

As China modernized, the north initially developed faster during the era of planned economic policies and Soviet aid, forming a concentration of construction and resource extraction industries. After the reform and opening up, however, the south took the lead due to manufacturing and eventually high-tech industries, as well as continued internal migration into the region. The north's share of China's GDP decreased from 42.9% in 2012 to 35.4% in 2019.

=== Health ===
A research showed that life expectancy was slightly higher in southern China compared to northern China. In 2018, it was 76.66 years for north and 77.35 for south. The shorter life expectancy in northern China can be partly attributed to outdoor air pollution due to winter district heating. According to the data from a survey in 2011, people in southern China were 10.51% less likely to be obese and overweight compared to the North.

== See also ==
- Cultural regions in China
- List of regions of China
- Nanquan (Southern Fist)
- Global North and Global South
- North–South divide in Taiwan
