= Journal of Thoracic Oncology =

Scientific journal

- Discipline: Oncology
- Language: English
- Edited by: Alex Adjei

Publication details
- History: 2006-present
- Publisher: Elsevier
- Frequency: 9/year
- Impact factor: 15.609 (2020)

Standard abbreviations
- ISO 4: J. Thorac. Oncol.

Indexing
- ISSN: 1556-0864 (print); 1556-1380 (web)
- OCLC no.: 723974312

Links
- Journal homepage; Online access; Online archive

The Journal of Thoracic Oncology is a peer-reviewed medical journal covering research into cancer of the thorax, especially lung cancer. It was established in 2006 and is published nine times per year by Elsevier on behalf of the International Association for the Study of Lung Cancer, of which it is the official journal. The editor-in-chief is Alex Adjei (Roswell Park Comprehensive Cancer Center). According to the Journal Citation Reports, the journal has a 2018 impact factor of 12.460.
