= Benshengren =

Pre-1945 ethnic Hoklo or Hakka Taiwanese nationals

Benshengren (Note: (Chinese: 本省人; pinyin: Běnshěngrén; Pe̍h-ōe-jī: Pún-síng-lâng; lit. 'People of this province')) are ethnic Hoklo or Hakka Taiwanese nationals who settled on the island prior to or during the Japanese colonization of Taiwan. Its usage is to differentiate the different culture, customs, and political sentiments within contemporary Taiwan between those who lived through World War II on the island and later migrants from Mainland China, who are known as waishengren. Hoklo and Hakka people who migrated to Taiwan after 1945, especially those who migrated with the retreat of the Nationalist-Led Chinese Government to Taiwan in 1949 are not included in this term.

== Etymology ==
During Japanese rule, the term "native islanders" was used to refer to Taiwanese local people, and the term "mainlanders" was used to refer to Japanese people. The term "Tangshan people" was used to refer to people who migrated to Taiwan from China during the Japanese period. It can thus be inferred that the term "Benshengren" came into being after the end of World War II when the Republic of China took over Taiwan. The opposite term is "Waishengren", or "people from other provinces" in Mandarin Chinese.

Although Hokko and Hakka people immigrated to Taiwan around the same time, the majority of the Taiwanese ethnic group is of Hoklo descent, who account for around three-quarters of Taiwan's population. Therefore, their mother tongue, Hokkien, is commonly spoken in Taiwan. Under Japanese rule, they were called "Taiwanese" by the Government-General of Taiwan. Since Hoklo Taiwanese often call themselves "native" or "Taiwanese", despite prior establishment of Indigenous Austronesian tribes, other ethnicities are called "Hakka", "Indigenous", or "outsiders" under their respective language background. The development of the term "native Taiwanese" arose within this context. In contrast, many Mandarin Speakers who are ethnic Han still refer to native Taiwanese only as Hoklo people, especially in China.

Under this historic distinction, "native Taiwanese" refers to the Hoklo people who immigrated to Taiwan before 1945 and speakers of Taiwanese Hokkien, including Hakka and Plains indigenous peoples who have assimilated into Hoklo Taiwanese culture and language. Some Hoklo Taiwanese incorrectly use the term to exclusively refer to Taiwanese of Hoklo culture who resided on the island before 1945.

The distinction between native and non-native Taiwanese is sometimes blurred. For example, Lin Yutang, a writer who relocated to Taiwan after the Second World War, should be considered non-native. However, Lin is a native of Pinghe county, Changchow city in Hokkien province. He once said: "People don't think I'm an outsider, and I don't think I'm an outsider. Maybe sometimes the language of communication between people is intimate." Lin also believes that language is a major factor in the distinction between native and non-native. In his short essay "Twenty-Four Happiness After Coming to Taiwan," he wrote: "When I first returned to the motherland, I lived on the mountain and heard the woman next door scold the child in obscene Hokkien. The northerners didn't understand it, but I did. What a joyous feeling!”, and elsewhere wrote “Sitting down in the cinema and hear the lady speak my hometown accent, like returning to your hometown. What a joyous feeling too!”

When Singapore’s Prime Minister Lee Kuan Yew came to Taiwan and visited Xitou, then President of the Republic of China Chiang Ching-kuo was frustrated when he saw Lee and the villagers talking happily in Hokkien. At a meeting of the Chinese Nationalist Party, Chiang said to the party and government officials, "We have always wanted to get into the Taiwanese circle. Taiwanese are not used to us and disagree with us because we are not familiar. We are inherently disadvantaged. Even Lee Kuan Yew can converse with Taiwanese people, we can't.” Chiang Ching-kuo also frustratedly said to MP Kang Ning-hsiang, “Foreign Heads of State visits Taiwan and can talk directly with Taiwanese people. As the President of Taiwan, I don't speak Taiwanese, and can't even understand anything Lee says to Taiwanese people.” People First Party chairman James Soong said that Chiang and Lee's visit to Xitou made Chiang ashamed of himself, and motivated him to learn Taiwanese. Although he still didn't know how to speak Taiwanese Hokkien towards the end of his rule, he could already understand it.

In addition to the original meaning of the term "native Taiwanese", the usage of this term also has lineage and class implications. Even if an individual's place of birth is in Taiwan, there are still differences between natives and non-natives. Fierce and bloody conflicts among Hoklo, Hakka, and indigenous Taiwanese peoples in the interests of commerce, land, and water resources occurred throughout early Taiwanese history. With the passage of time and the emergence of new dominant powers such as the Japanese, the rift between the native ethnic groups on the island gradually faded. Moreover, not all the people who came to Taiwan before waves of Chinese and Japanese colonial governments were immigrants from southern Hokkien and Hakka areas, such as migrants of She and Hui ethnicities. As the current Taiwanese government further democratizes and establishes its unique identity from China, non-native Taiwanese also claim the "non-native" term as a way to differentiate themselves from Chinese citizens.

== Other names ==
The outline of Taiwan's main island resembles the shape of a sweet potato. Native Taiwanese sometimes call themselves "sweet potato people" (番薯仔; Taiwanese: han-tsî-á). However, sweet potatoes are only native to the Americas and were introduced to Taiwan by the Dutch during the Dutch colonization of Taiwan.

In contrast to sweet potatoes, people from other provinces who moved to Taiwan from mainland China after the end of the World War II are referred to as "taro people" (芋仔; ōo-á). For example, it is common in colloquial speech to call older soldiers from other provinces "old taro". The offspring of native Taiwanese and Nationalist era migrants are sometimes jokingly called "taro sweet potatoes". Ironically, taro has a much longer agricultural and culinary history on the island. It is commonly found in some Austronesian and Hoklo diets. "Taro cookies" are common in some Formosan diets. The Paiwan people use a special kiln roast method to preserve dried taro, which can be eaten alone or cooked, or ground into powder for cooking. In Paiwan cuisine, taro stems can also be used as food ingredients, but specific parts must be cut and specially processed in order to avoid physical discomfort after ingesting. Hoklo people also make a purée dish with taro: fresh taro is peeled and cut into pieces, steamed in a basket, mashed, mixed with lard and sugar, and finally garnished with peanuts, sesame seeds, and butterflied plums. Taro purée is most commonly served as a dessert at the end of a banquet. Other methods include wire-drawing taro, fried taro cake, Muscovy taro, and others.
