= Xitou Nature Education Area =

Forest in Lugu, Nantou County, Taiwan

Xitou Nature Education Area Chinese: 溪頭自然教育園區
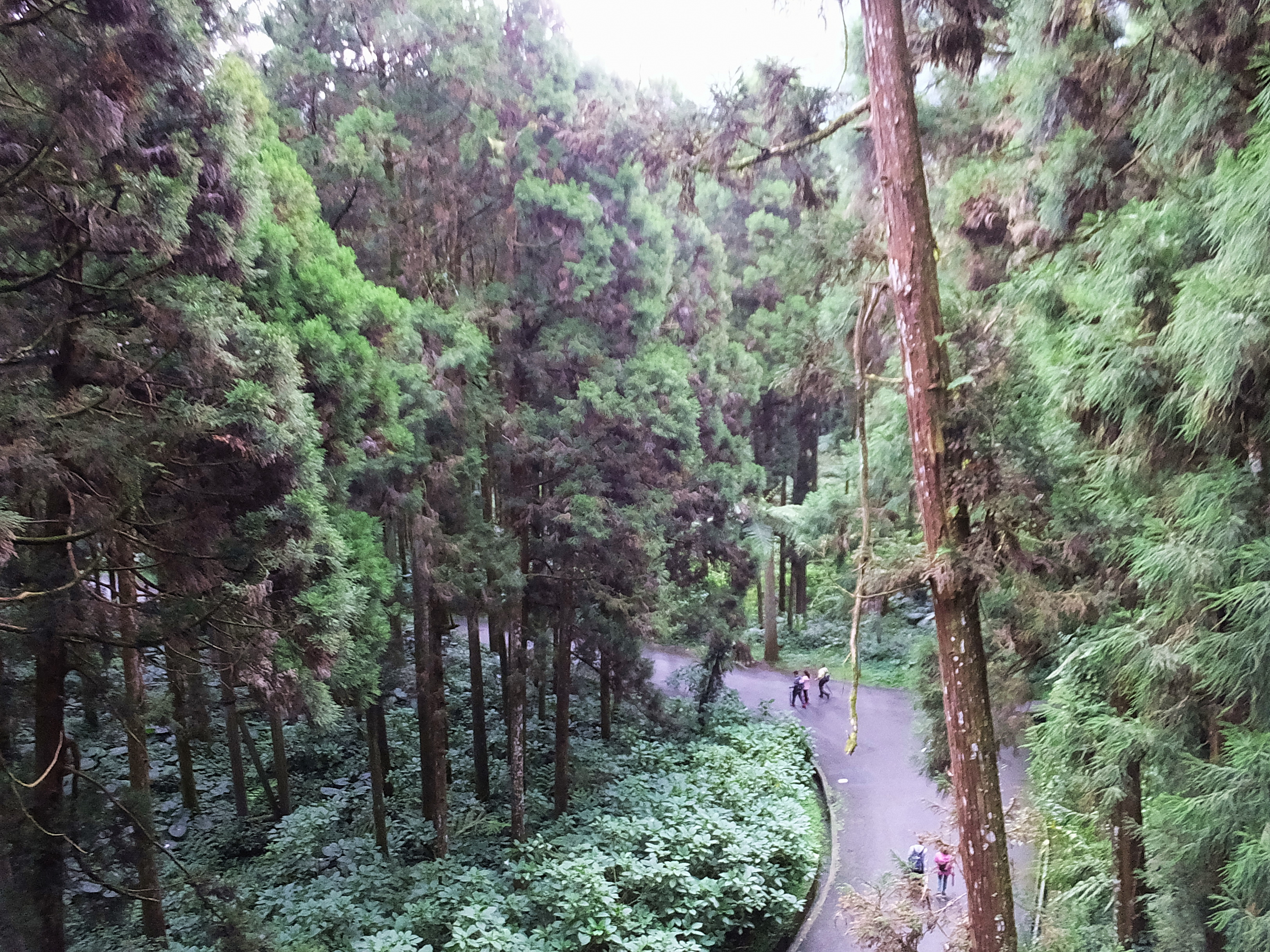
- Interactive map of Xitou Nature Education Area

Geography
- Location: Lugu, Nantou County, Taiwan
- Coordinates: 23°40′29.2″N 120°47′48.6″E
- Elevation: 1,150 m (3,770 ft)
- Area: 2,500 ha (6,200 acres)

Administration
- Status: nature reserve
- Established: 1970

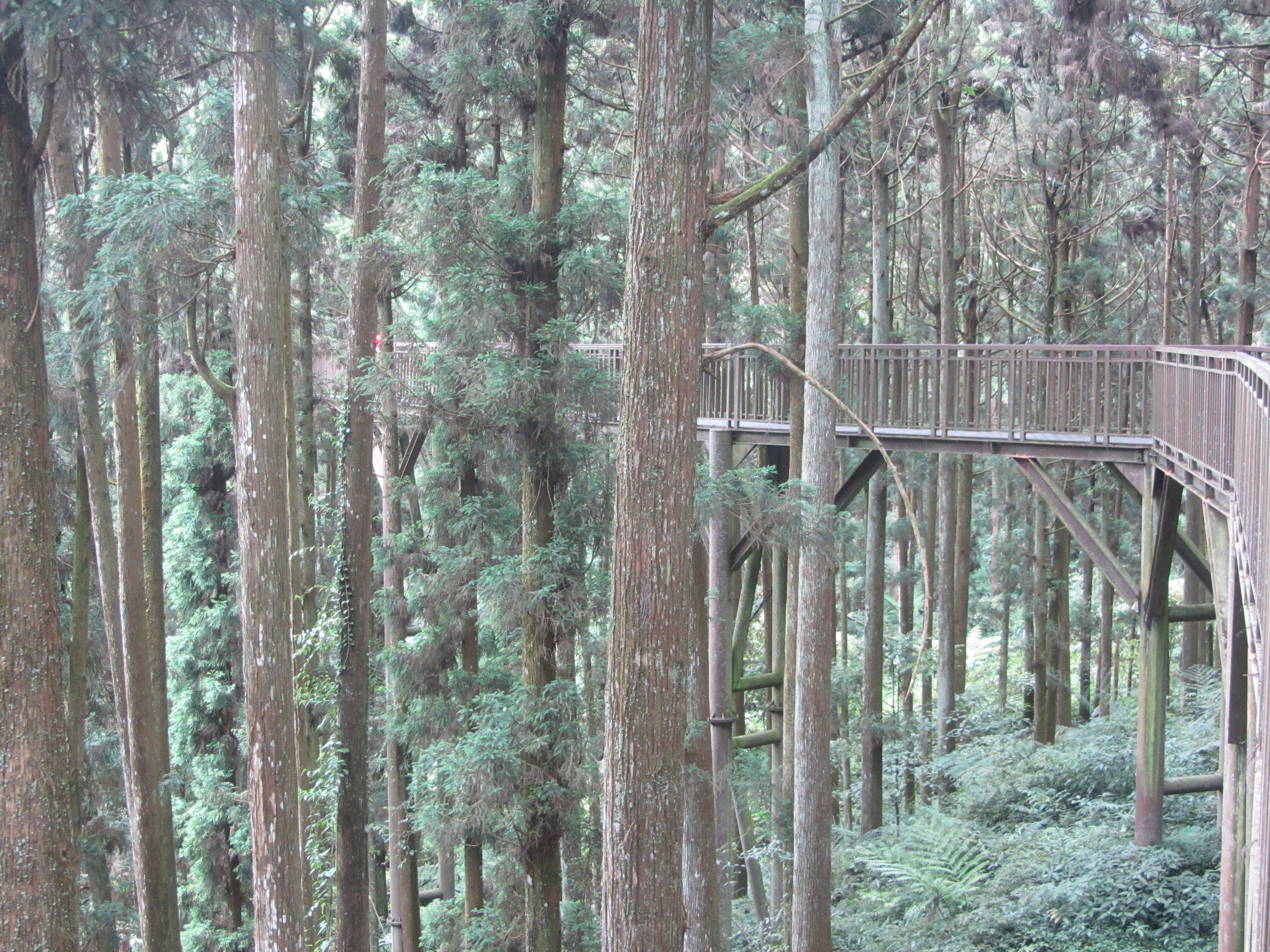
Skywalk in the park

Xitou Nature Education Area or Xitou Bamboo Forest (traditional Chinese: 溪頭自然教育園區; simplified Chinese: 溪头自然教育园区; pinyin: Xītóu Zìrán Jiàoyù Yuánqū) is a forest park in Lugu Village, Lugu Township, Nantou County, Taiwan.

== Name ==
Xitou is derived from a Chinese word with the meaning of the origin of river.

== History ==
During the Japanese rule of Taiwan, the forest was used as an experimental forest for University of Tokyo students. Later after the handover of Taiwan from Japan to the Republic of China in 1945, the forest was declared a nature reserve and named Xitou Nature Education Area in 1970. On 11 September 2016, a 2,800-year old giant tree fell after long heavy rain, injuring three visitors.

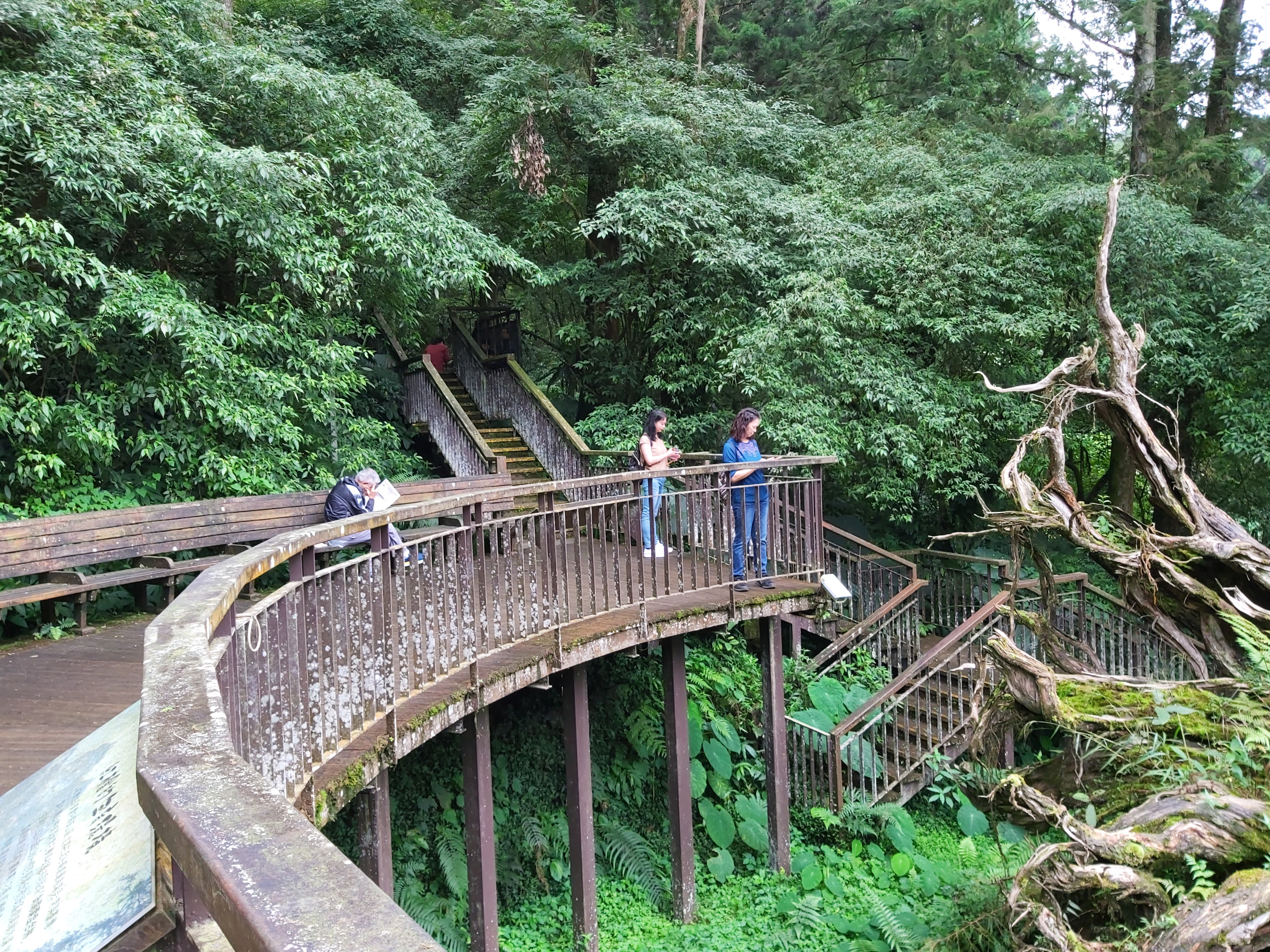
Viewing platform of the giant tree

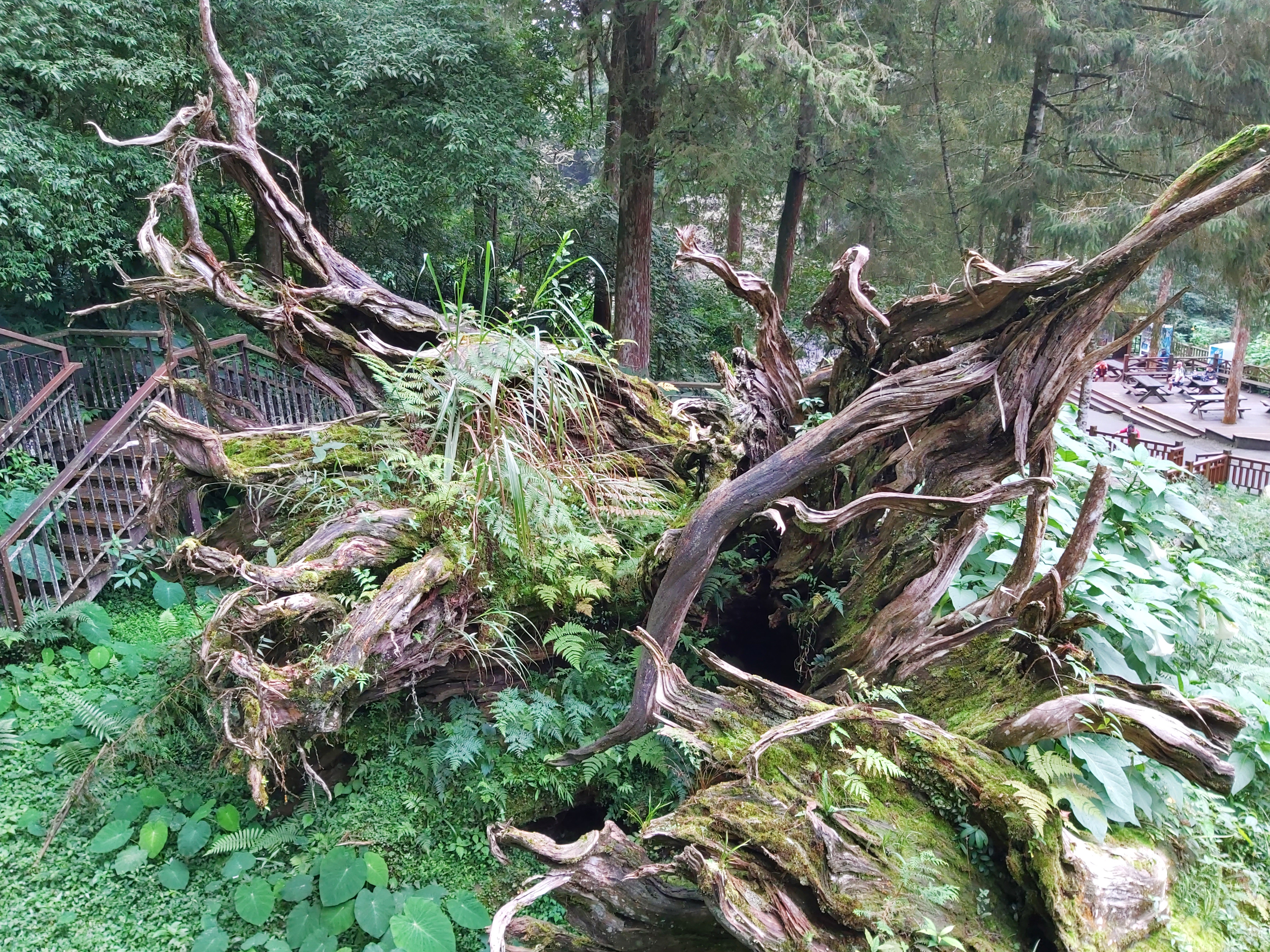
The giant tree fell in September 2016

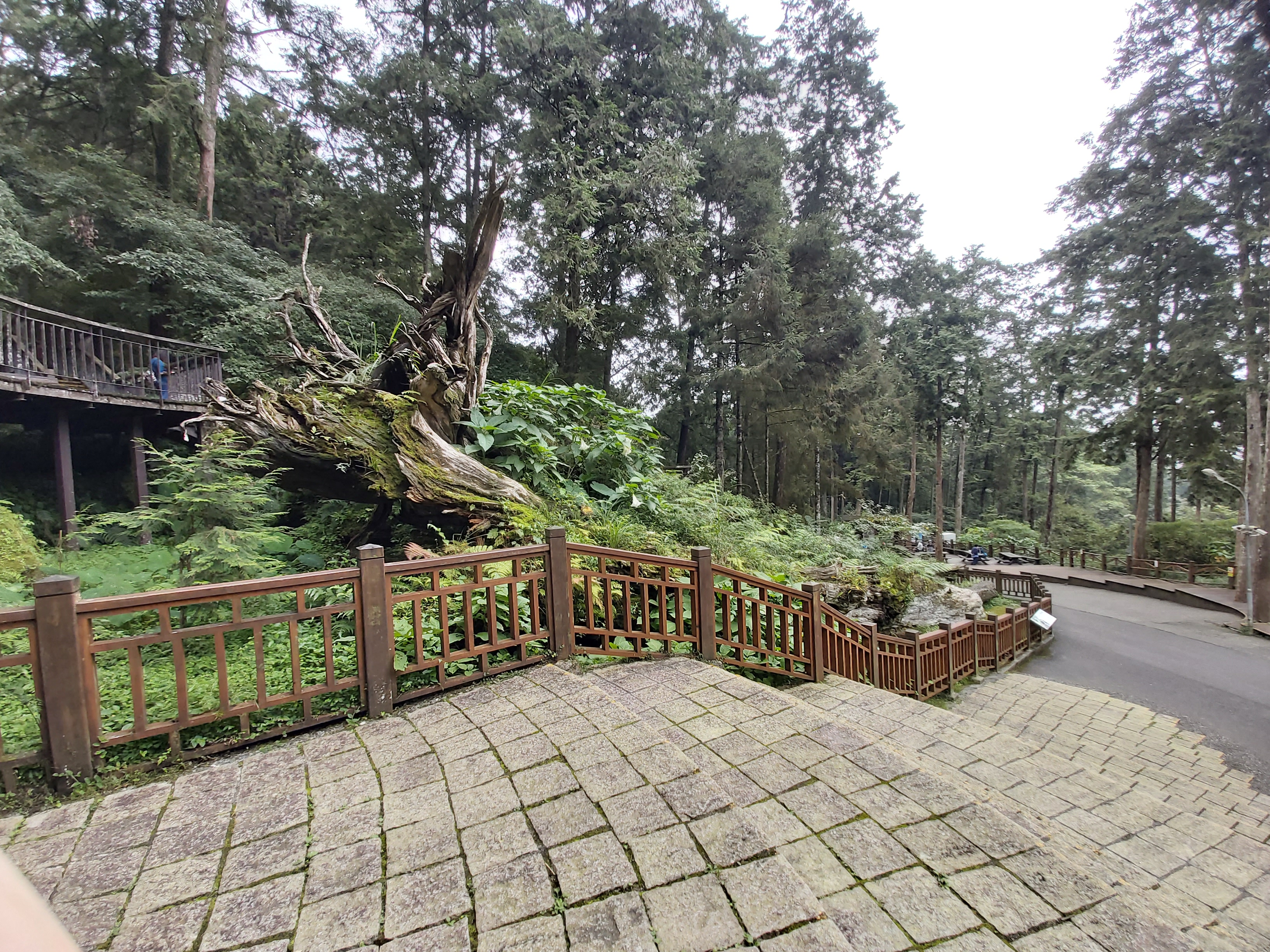
Front of the viewing platform

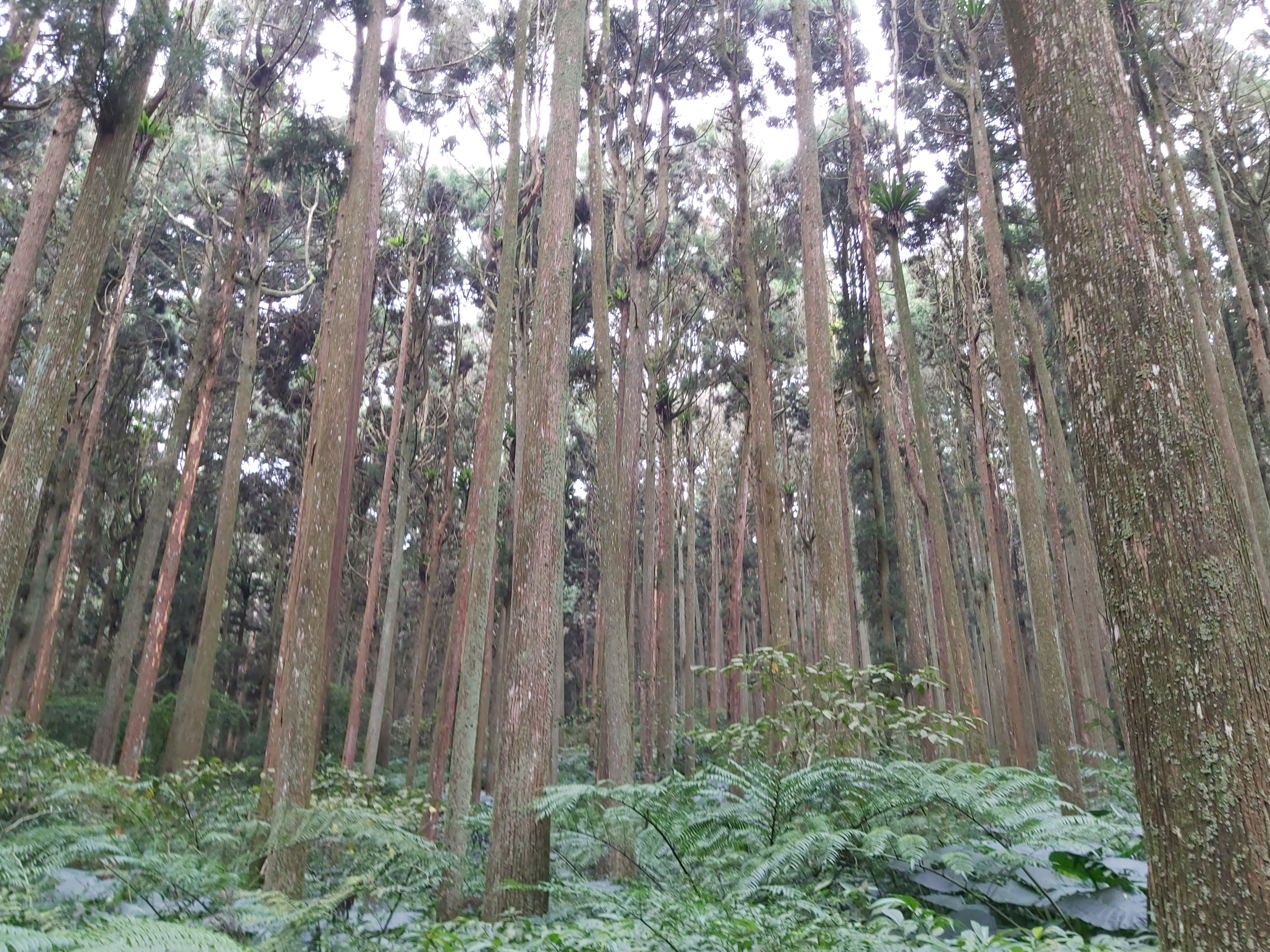
Cryptomeria

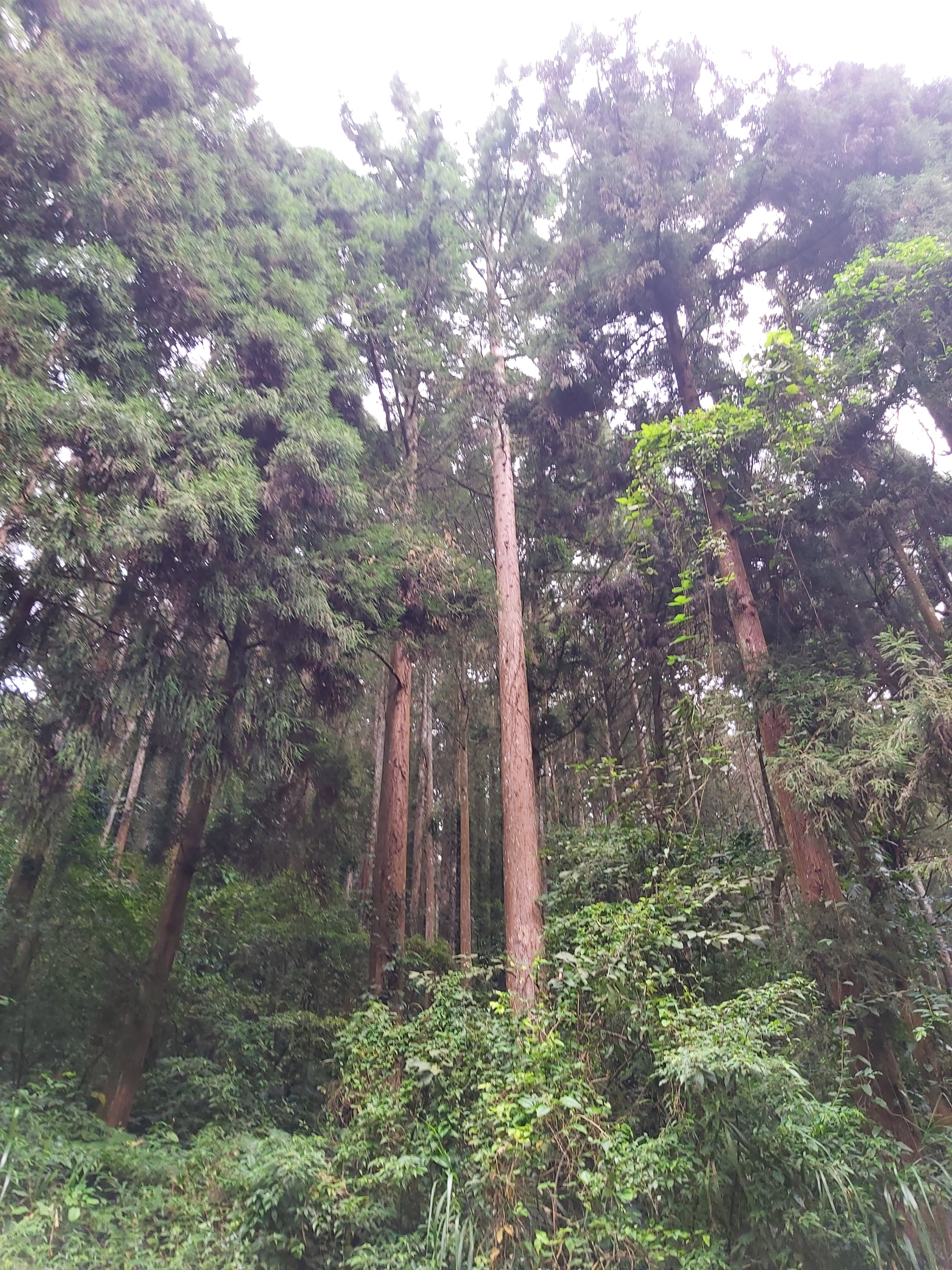
Taiwania

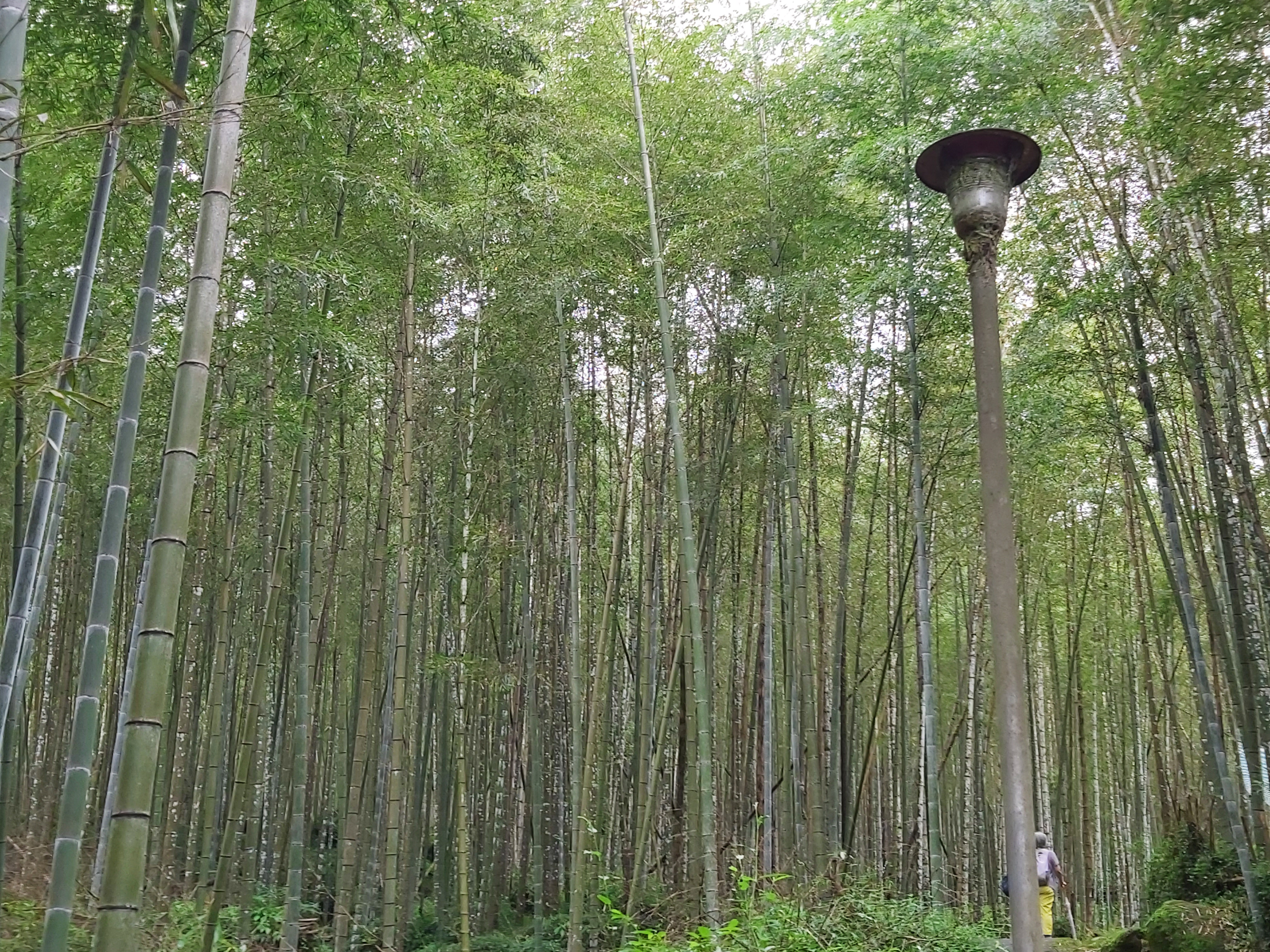
Phyllostachys edulis

== Geography ==
The forest is located within a valley of mountain on its three sides and consists of many bamboos. It also has Ginkgo biloba garden. It is located at an average altitude of 1,150 meters above sea level and spans over an area of 2,500 hectares. The highest mountain peak within the forest reaches 2,025 meters above sea level, which is Mount Lingtou. It has a cool climate all year round with average monthly temperature ranges from 11-28°C and average monthly of 16.6°C. The average annual rainfall is 2,635.18 mm. The forest is home to more than 70 species of bird.

=== Climate ===
Climate data for Xitou, elevation 1,150 m (3,770 ft), (2017–2023 normals, extremes 2016–present)
Month	Jan	Feb	Mar	Apr	May	Jun	Jul	Aug	Sep	Oct	Nov	Dec	Year
Record high °C (°F)	23.3 (73.9)	25.7 (78.3)	27.8 (82.0)	27.6 (81.7)	28.8 (83.8)	30.3 (86.5)	29.7 (85.5)	29.1 (84.4)	27.9 (82.2)	28.5 (83.3)	28.0 (82.4)	25.2 (77.4)	30.3 (86.5)
Mean daily maximum °C (°F)	17.7 (63.9)	18.0 (64.4)	20.0 (68.0)	21.4 (70.5)	24.0 (75.2)	25.3 (77.5)	26.2 (79.2)	25.3 (77.5)	25.0 (77.0)	23.0 (73.4)	21.8 (71.2)	18.8 (65.8)	22.2 (72.0)
Daily mean °C (°F)	12.2 (54.0)	12.7 (54.9)	14.8 (58.6)	16.6 (61.9)	19.2 (66.6)	20.4 (68.7)	21.0 (69.8)	20.8 (69.4)	20.2 (68.4)	18.4 (65.1)	16.4 (61.5)	13.6 (56.5)	17.2 (63.0)
Mean daily minimum °C (°F)	9.0 (48.2)	9.5 (49.1)	11.3 (52.3)	13.5 (56.3)	16.2 (61.2)	17.4 (63.3)	17.9 (64.2)	18.1 (64.6)	17.4 (63.3)	15.6 (60.1)	13.4 (56.1)	10.6 (51.1)	14.2 (57.5)
Record low °C (°F)	−0.8 (30.6)	0.4 (32.7)	2.4 (36.3)	3.2 (37.8)	11.8 (53.2)	15.3 (59.5)	15.2 (59.4)	16.0 (60.8)	12.6 (54.7)	9.1 (48.4)	7.0 (44.6)	2.4 (36.3)	−0.8 (30.6)
Average precipitation mm (inches)	59.7 (2.35)	59.2 (2.33)	90.6 (3.57)	140.9 (5.55)	344.1 (13.55)	411.8 (16.21)	363.8 (14.32)	436.4 (17.18)	232.6 (9.16)	80.6 (3.17)	45.0 (1.77)	52.0 (2.05)	2,316.7 (91.21)
Average precipitation days	7.0	6.4	9.5	12.2	19.2	19.5	19.1	22.1	16.2	7.7	4.7	5.0	148.6
Average relative humidity (%)	87.1	88.7	89.6	91.4	92.6	93.0	92.4	93.7	93.0	92.9	90.9	89.4	91.2
Source 1: Central Weather Administration
Source 2: Atmospheric Science Research and Application Databank (precipitation 1993–2023, precipitation days 2011–2023)

== Facilities ==
The forest features many hiking trails and pavements, 22.6-meter high and 180-meter long skywalk through canopies and observatory at a height of more than 2,000 meters above sea level. It also provides electric cars rental, shops, Vacation Forest Natural Ecology Exhibition Center, tourist service center, restaurant and hotel.

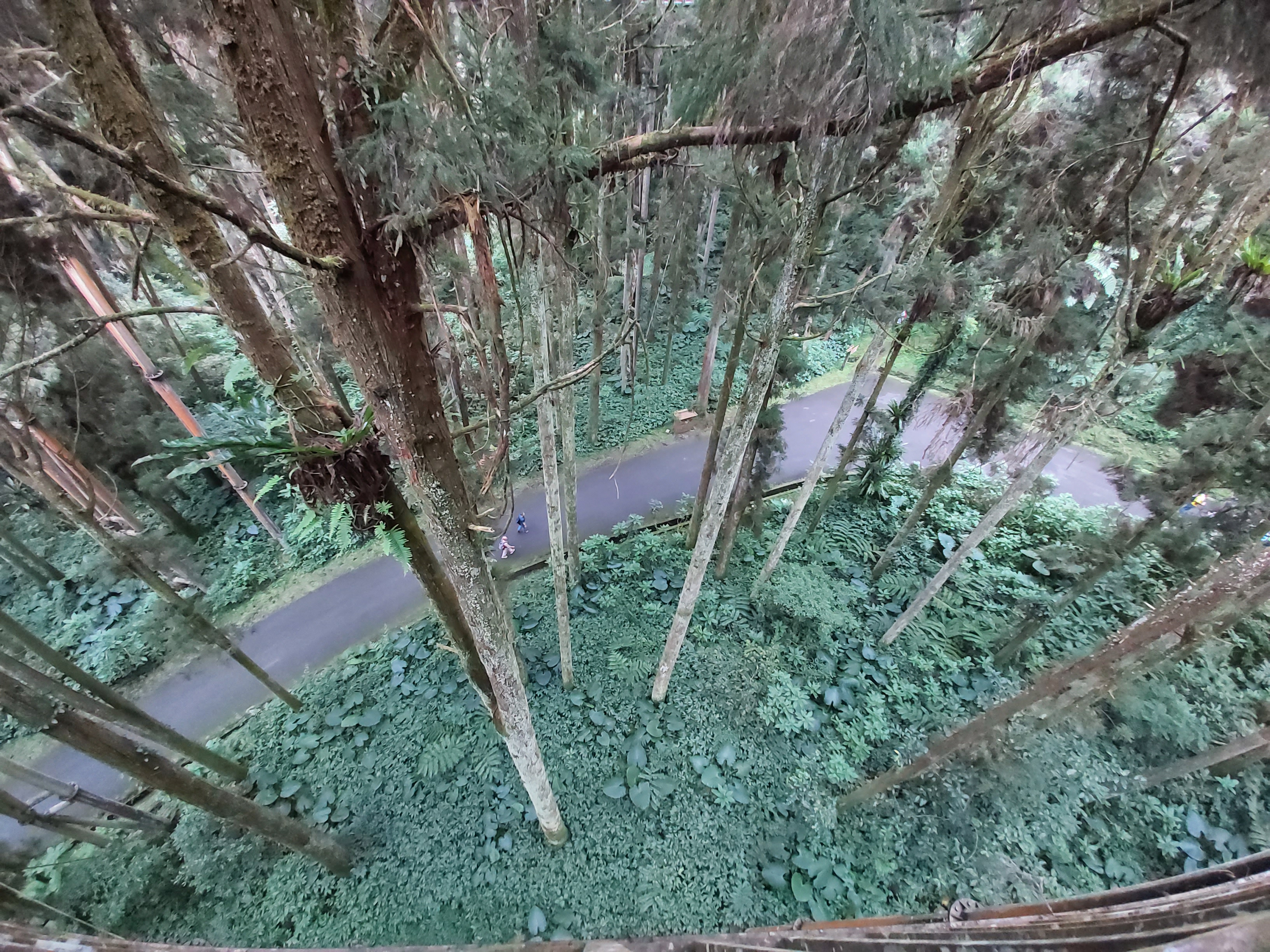
View from the skywalk

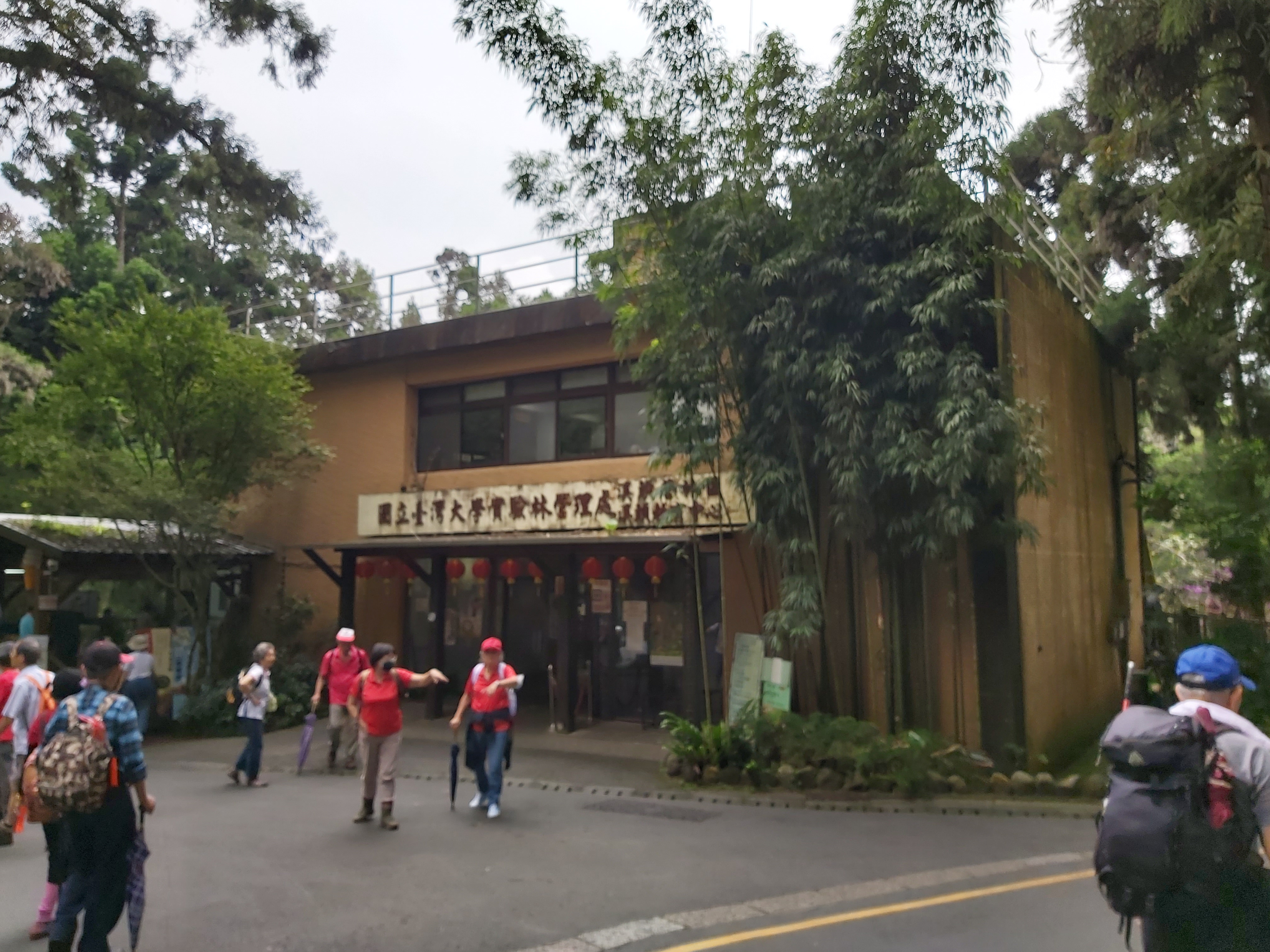
Education center

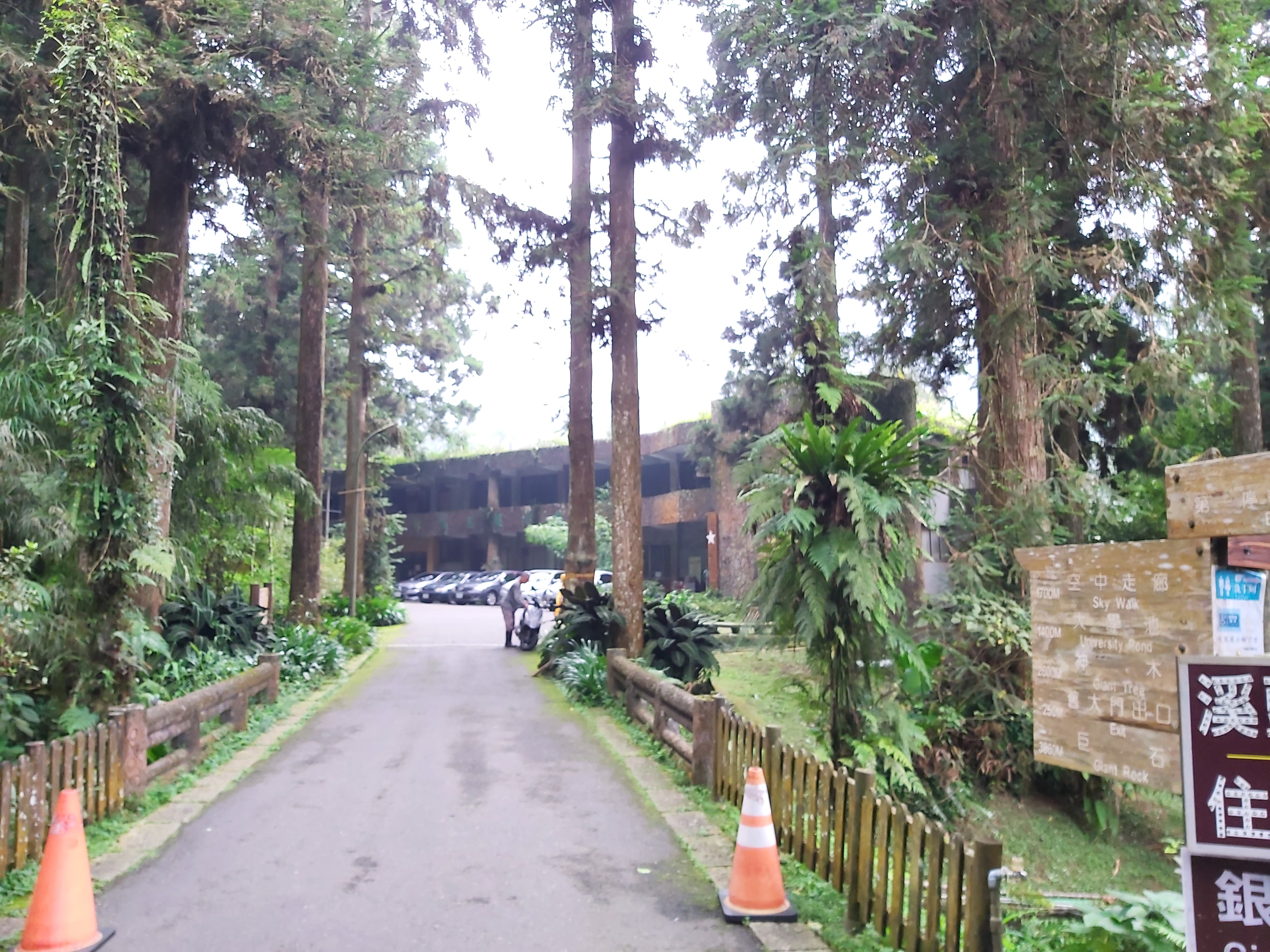
Vacation Forest Natural Ecology Exhibition Center

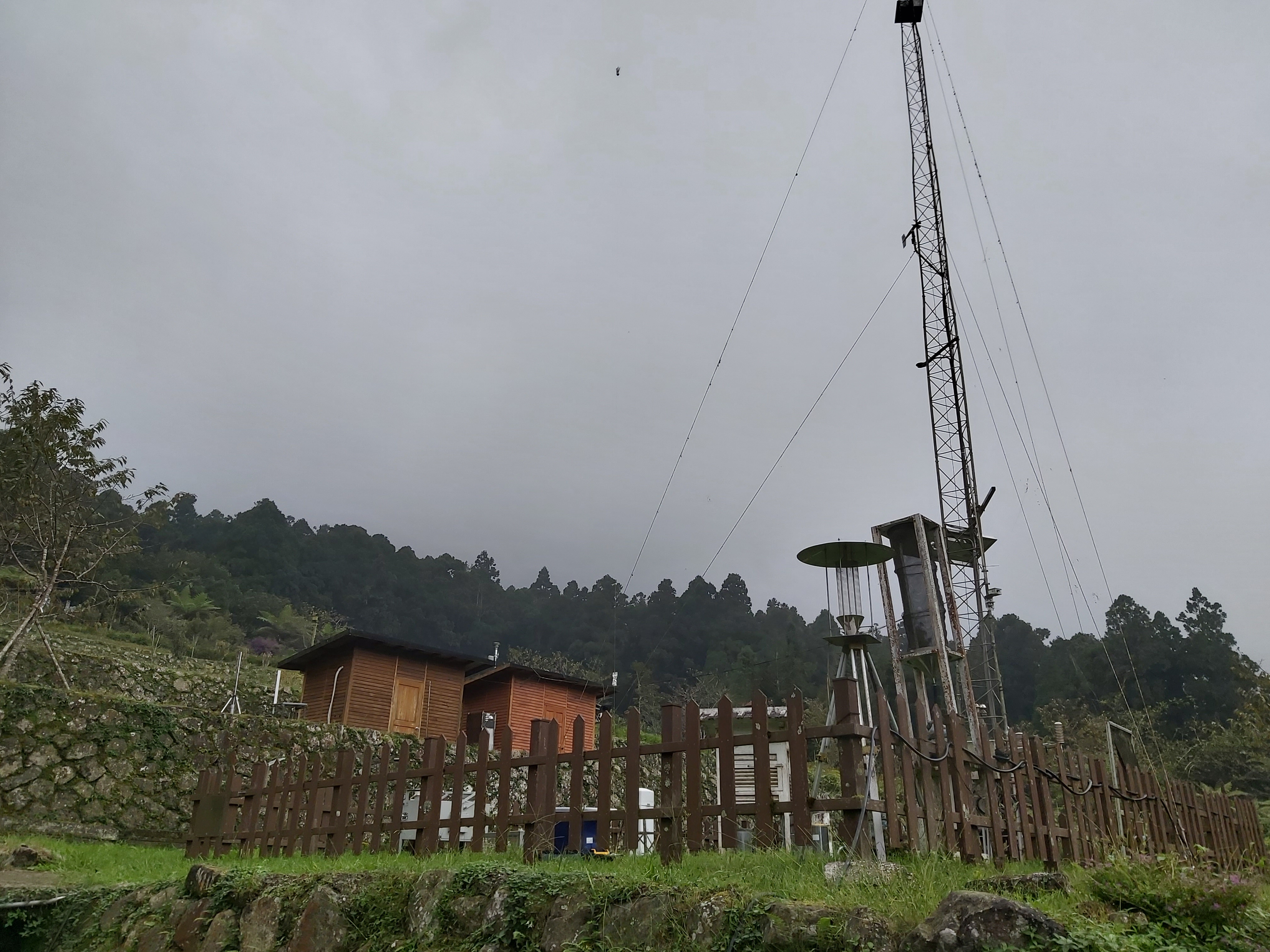
Xitou Weather station

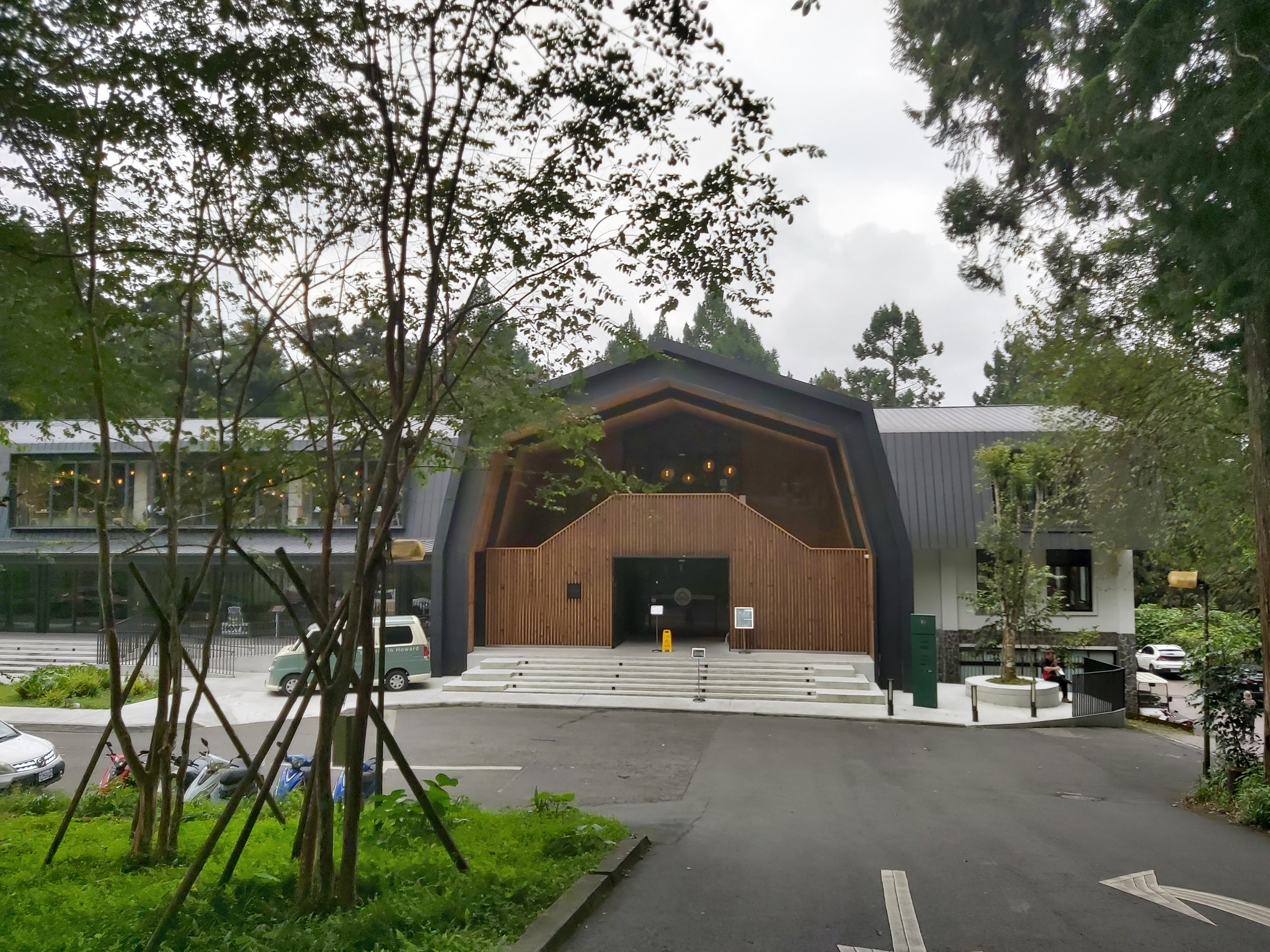
Yun-Shan Restaurant, Howard Resort

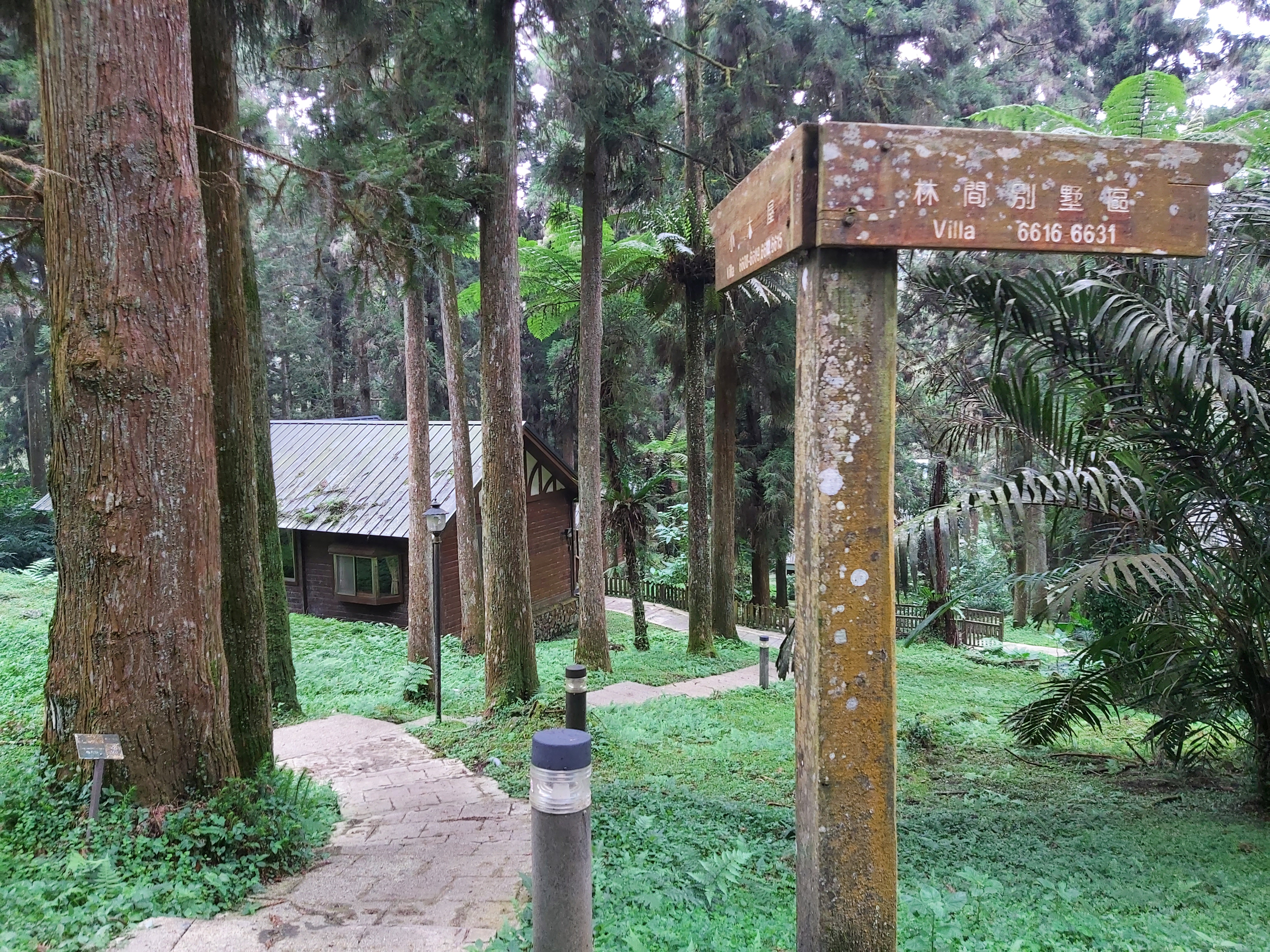
Education Center villa

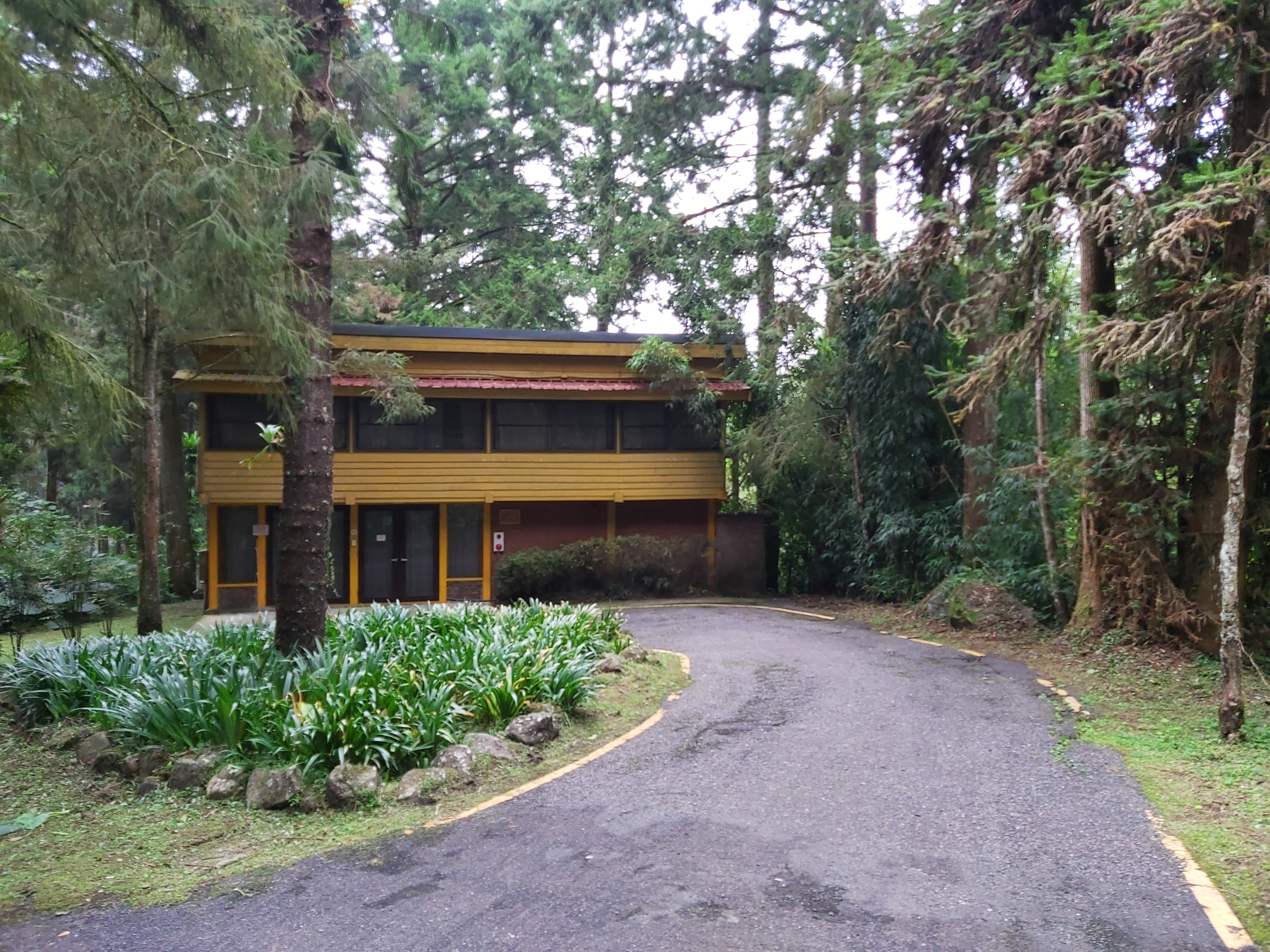
Wooden Cottage

== Activities ==
The main objective of the forest is the promotion of natural education of nursing natural ecology. The forest is part of experimental forest belongs to National Taiwan University.

== Transportation ==
The forest is accessible by bus from Taichung, Caotun Township, Nantou City, Zhushan Township and Douliu City.

== See also ==
- Geography of Taiwan
