= Ding Shiue-ju =

Chinese-Taiwanese modernist painter

- 丁學洙
- Born: 3 March 1913; Guoyang County, Anhui, China
- Died: 5 March 2002 (aged 89); Taitung City, Taiwan
- Education: Shanghai School of Fine Arts; Wuchang College of Art
- Known for: Watercolor, ink wash and Pastels

Ding Shiue-ju (Chinese: 丁學洙; 3 March 1913 — 5 March 2002) was a painter and art educator born in Guoyang County, Anhui, China, and who lived many years in Taitung City, Taiwan. He was part of the first generation of Western-style painters in Taiwan's post-war period and a victim of the White Terror. During his younger years in China, he was highly active in the modernist watercolor circle. After moving to Taiwan, he turned to ink wash painting and pastels, becoming an iconic modernist painter of eastern Taiwan.

== Life ==
=== Early life ===
Ding Shiue-ju was born in Guoyang County, Anhui, China. His education in art began at the age of nine. In 1932, he went to study at Shanghai School of Fine Arts (上海美術專科學校; today's Shanghai University Fine Arts College), where he learned watercolor painting and received guidance from college president Liu Haisu, watercolor instructor Wang Jiyuan, and drawing instructor Gong Bizheng (龔必正), all of whom were of the modernist school.

With the outbreak of the Battle of Shanghai in 1937 at the start of the Second Sino-Japanese War, Shanghai became embroiled in fighting, so Ding was forced to quit his studies, becoming relegated to Kuomintang-controlled areas and making a living by teaching. In 1940, he began studying at the Wuchang College of Art (武昌藝術專科學校; today's Hubei Institute of Fine Arts) in Chongqing, Sichuan, under the guidance of instructors Zhang Zhaoming (張肇銘) and Tang Yihe (唐一禾), where he studied ink wash painting, bamboo and wood sculpture, and music.

After graduating from the Wuchang Art School in 1941, he taught at Tongliang Middle School for Girls (銅梁女中) and Sichuan Leshan Normal School (四川樂山師範), during which time he frequently visited Mount Emei to paint scenery, and he also held exhibitions. Aesthetician Zhu Guangqian wrote a piece of calligraphy in praise of Ding's 1944 exhibition in Leshan. He also exhibit in the 3rd National Art Exhibition of Republic of China this year. In 1946, he traveled east along the Yangtze, painting the scenery of Tongliang, Rongchang, Leshan, and Chongqing while passing through. Upon arrival in Nanjing, he held a solo exhibition. The journey became a very important influence on his creativity. That same year, he returned to his home province of Anhui to teach, his pupils including accomplished Chinese-painting artist Wu Guoting (吳國亭).

=== in Taipei ===
In 1947, Ding moved to Taiwan to teach at the Taipei Normal College for Women (臺北女子師範專科學校; Today's University of Taipei) and held solo exhibitions that year and in 1949 and 1953 at the Zhongshan Hall in Taipei. In 1948, Liu Haisu held an exhibition in Taiwan, at which time he invited Ding to return to Shanghai to teach at the Fine Arts College of Shanghai University, but Ding respectfully declined. After the Kuomintang government moved to Taiwan, Ding decided to stay in Taiwan. His third exhibition at the Zhongshan Hall in 1953 attracted many viewers and made quite a stir in the Taipei art circle. Liu Chen, Yu Yu-jen, and Ma Shou-hua (馬壽華) wrote a joint note of congratulations to Ding for the exhibition.

In late 1953, Ding was accused of "holding to leftist ideology and participating in anti-Japanese activity in China" and thus sentenced to five years in prison. After being released, he began to teach at Li-Hsing Middle School (勵行中學), his notable pupils including well-known athlete Chi Cheng. During this time, he became close friends with painters Liu Chi-wei (劉其偉) and Read Lee. Since Ding was not a member of any art societies or organizations, these two friends became his main points of connection with the painting circle after he left Taipei.

In 1961, he was invited by Wang Lan to show work in the Republic of China Watercolor and Calligraphy Exhibition at the R.O.C. Embassy in the Philippines. 21 other reputed Taiwanese watercolor artists showed there too, including Ma Pai-sui (馬白水), Liu Chi-wei, Chang Chieh, Shiy De-jinn, Liang Chung-ming (梁中銘), Read Lee, and Wang Lan.

A shooting took place at Li-Hsing Middle School while Ding worked there, and his wife died of illness then too, greatly affecting him psychologically and physically, so in 1968, he left Taipei and moved to Taitung to teach at what is now Tung Hai Junior High School (東海國民中學).

=== in Taitung ===
Ding moved to Taitung to teach at what is currently Tung Hai Junior High School in 1968. He started producing a large quantity of traditional ink wash paintings and ran an art studio in his free time to teach numerous local artists. For Ding's fourth solo exhibition at the Zhongshan Hall in 1977, Liu Chi-wei wrote the artist's introduction, in which he summarized Ding's style for the first half of his life. Ding retired from Tung Hai Junior High in 1980.

In 1984, at the recommendation of Liu Chi-wei and Read Lee, Ding was awarded the Art Society of China (中華民國畫學會)'s Golden Goblet Award (金爵獎). In 1986, one of his students gave him a box of pastels, giving Ding the opportunity to start using this medium to sketch scenery on site in Taitung. This led to him creating a great number of pastel sketches of Taitung's landscape.

In 1990, he showed in the Fine Arts College of Shanghai University Student-Teacher Exhibition at the National Museum of History, where he again saw Liu Haisu. In 1992, he went to Anhui to visit family and was able to see his old student Wu Guoting. However, he became ill and returned to Taiwan to rest for several months. After recuperating, he held the exhibition Looking Back on 80 Years at the Taitung County Culture Center (臺東縣立文化中心).

After retiring from teaching, his only income was his pension, so life was extremely difficult. Nonetheless, he was adamant about not selling his work because he believed each piece possessed his spirit and emotions and was thus something money could not buy.

In 1998, his son applied for compensation from the government for Ding's wrongful political imprisonment, and in 2001, the Taiwanese government awarded him NT$2 million based on the Compensation Act for Wrongful Trials on Charges of Sedition and Espionage during the Martial Law Period.

In 2001, he held a solo exhibition at the National Sun Yat-sen Memorial Hall. He died at the age of 90 in his home in March the following year.

== Style ==
Ding focused mainly on watercolors, ink wash painting, and pastels and was strongly influenced by the Western painting of Liu Haisu and Chinese painting of Tang Yihe. Watercolors make up the bulk of his early work, though he occasionally did ink wash paintings too. In his later years, health problems made watercolor painting difficult, so he shifted to ink wash paintings and pastels.

=== Watercolor ===
Much of his watercolor work is on-site sketches. He excelled at observing and presenting the colors of the morning, the sky at dusk, and misty landscapes. He combined his perspective of scenery with linear-perspective composition and applied his knowledge of chromatics to create landscape effects. Many of his watercolors were done while he was in China, most being of places along the Yangtze and Sichuan. The style and color are celebrated for their fullness, much like that of fauvism. However, most of that work was lost during the chaos of war and thus not brought to Taiwan. The National Taiwan Museum of Fine Arts has some of his work.

=== Ink wash ===
Ding highly respected the "bone method" (one of Xie He's "Six Principles of Chinese Painting," which emphasizes that when lines comply with the regularity of nature, they create a vivid sense). Many of his later ink wash paintings consisted merely of lines and few details. Influenced by his teacher Liu Haisu, Ding used color in place of black or gray washes in his landscapes and imitated Western painting by adding any text (including his signature) in deep red in a way that incorporates them into the painting. He excelled at using Western composition techniques in his landscapes to create the effect of viewing the subject from overhead. In negative spaces, he would write short passages, expressions of his feelings.

=== Pastels ===
Ding was influenced by impressionists Monet and Van Gogh. With pastels, he mainly worked outside to see his subjects in the sunlight, depicting how the changes in light throughout the day affect the subject. Most of his pastel work is of scenery in Taitung. In his later years when he had limited mobility, his students accompanied him to places near his home, including rice fields in the Taitung City outskirts, Fugang Fishery Harbor, Xiaoyeliu (小野柳), and Shanyuan Bay (杉原灣). He also painted scenes of his homeland, China, from memory. Thus, his pastel work may be divided into three thematic categories: fields, seascapes and skyscapes, and China.

He usually depicted objects with black lines, creating a vague phantasmic feeling that contrasts with the yellows, blues, greens, and purples of the sun-colored sky, producing an effect of "substance within the obscure" in expressing his pain.

== Acclaim ==
- Zhu Guangqian wrote of Ding, "The artistic conception of his small watercolors is profound, and his brushstrokes are both smooth and impartial. He has not fallen into the current bad habits of crude unrestraint and superficial extravagance. Unfortunately, his work may not satiate the preferences of today's society, but he ought not to mind. I often claim that a major taboo of an artist is to rise and fall with the waves of the world and fail to maintain one's focus. He who is unwilling to concentrate on his own lonely road of creation shall be unable to delve deeply into the realm of subtlety and gain self-attained understanding. I wonder whether the admirable Ding feels the same?"
- Liu Haisu wrote this on a piece of calligraphy entitled Spiritual Resonance and Vitality, which he gave to Ding as a gift: "In the style and composition of the watercolors of my student Ding Shiue-ju, there are neither too many nor too few lines. The style is full of inflections, subtle, beautiful, and one-of-a-kind, which is why his work is unparalleled by anyone else's."

== Awards ==
- 1985 Golden Goblet Award for watercolor from the Art Society of China
- 1998 Bronze Arts and Business Award from the Council for Cultural Affairs
