= Auguste Leroux =

French painter and illustrator (1871–1954)

Jules Marie Auguste Leroux
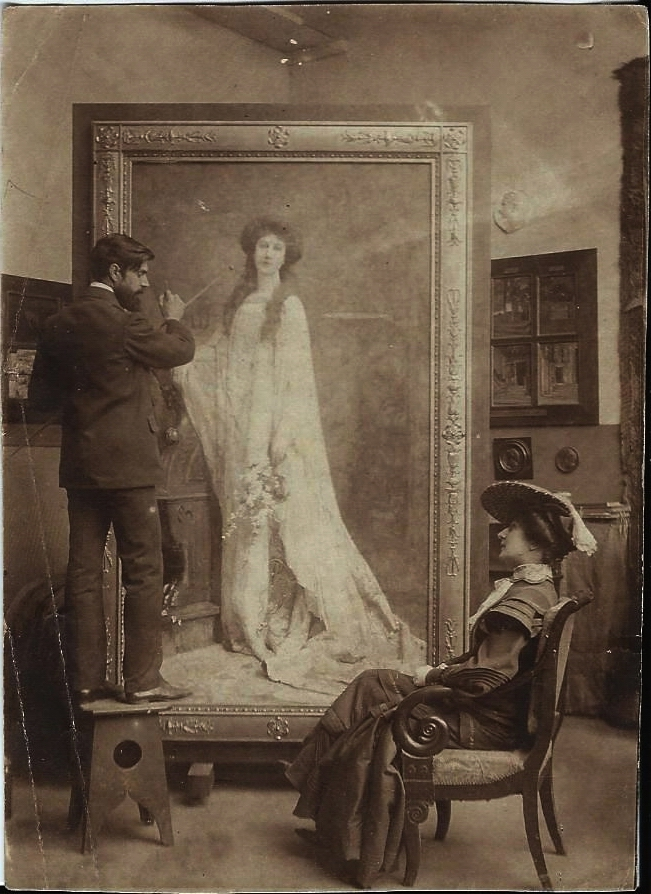
- Auguste Leroux in his studio (1903)
- Born: 14 April 1871; Paris, France
- Died: 26 March 1954 (aged 82); Paris, France
- Occupation: Painter

Jules Marie Auguste Leroux (14 April 1871 – 26 March 1954) was a French painter and illustrator.

== Biography ==
Jules Marie Auguste Leroux was born in the 3rd arrondissement of Paris on 14 April 1871, during the Commune. His father, Gustav Ferdinand Leroux, was a publisher of prints established at 43 rue Saint-André-des-Arts. The family had its roots in the neighborhood of Coutances (Manche), in the village of Trelly.

As a young man he entered the École nationale supérieure des arts décoratifs where he studied drawing nudes from models and after academics. He was forced work on fashion drawings and illustrations for children. In 1892 he was then admitted to the École nationale supérieure des Beaux-Arts on the Rue Bonaparte, where he studied in the studio of Léon Bonnat (1833-1922).

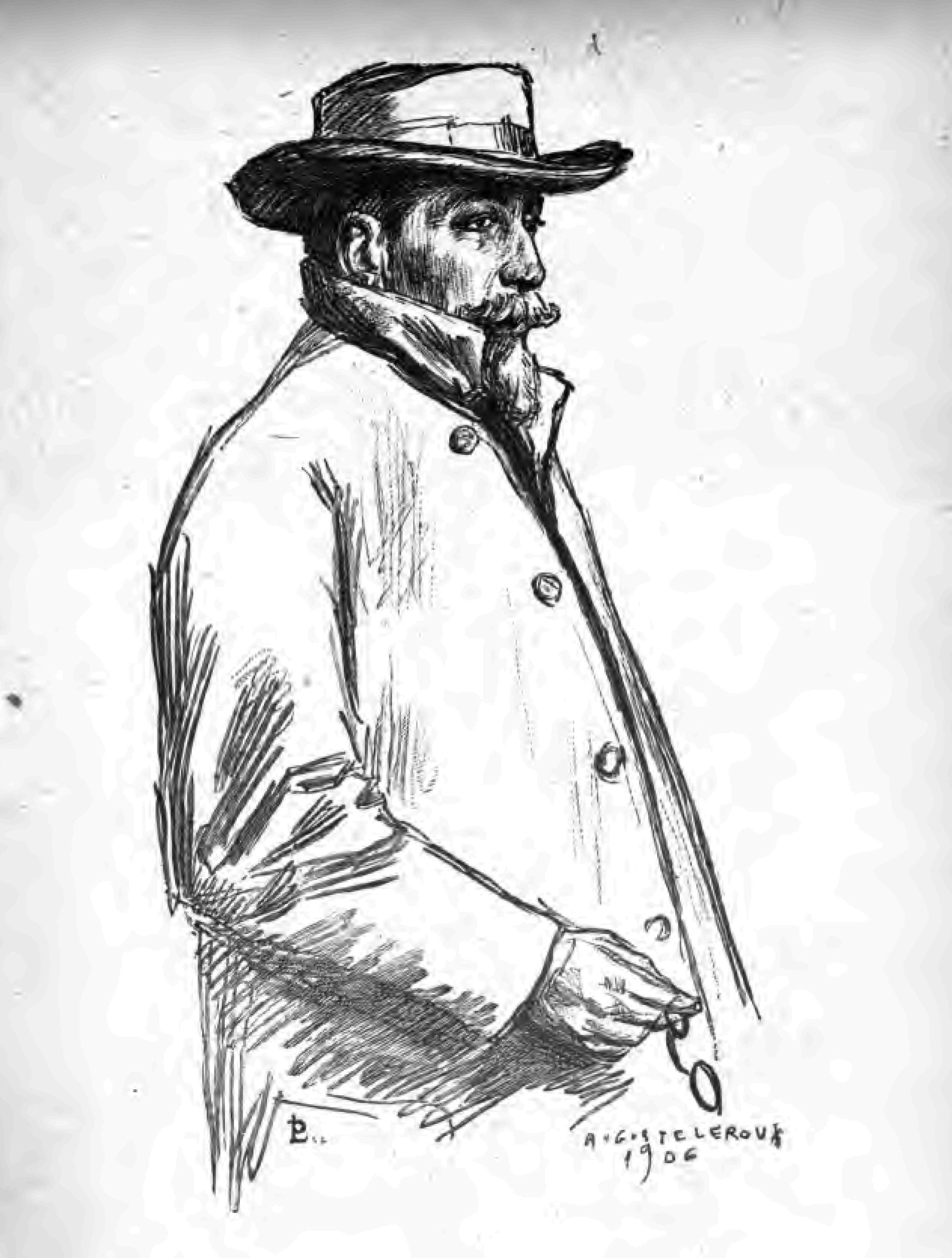
Drawing of Anatole France, 1906

He won many successes including the 3rd drawing Medal in January 1892, the 2nd Medal in July and the 2nd Medal in November of that year. He did his military service with the 46th Infantry at Fontainebleau. Back in Paris in September 1893, he won the prize for figure drawing in November 1893 and the prize for torso in March 1894. He remained with the school until he was aged 23. He won the first Grand Prix de Rome in June 1894 with Judith presenting the Head of Holofernes to the people of Bethulia. (Painting preserved at the National School of Fine Arts of Paris).

He left for Italy for three years of study at the Villa Medici in Rome from 1895 to 1898, accompanied by the painter Adolphe Déchenaud and musician Henri Rabaud. At the villa, he met the musician Henri Büsser, with whom he befriended and whose portrait he painted. He exhibited at the Salon of French artists from the beginning of the year 1898. He earned a bronze medal at the Universal Exhibition in Paris in 1900.

In 1906, he married Clotilde Morel. In 1908 he moved with his wife to a large house in the Quartier du Petit-Montrouge, in the 14th arrondissement of Paris, Villa d'Alesia. The top floor of the house, covered with a large glass roof, naturally became his workshop. He would live there until the end of his life surrounded by his wife and three children. He was a professor at the École nationale supérieure des Beaux-Arts in Paris for 30 years, a jury member of the committee of French Artists Society in 1904, an art teacher at the Académie de la Grande Chaumière, and was made a knight of the Legion of Honor.

Auguste Leroux died in Paris on 26 March 1954. The sculptor Claude Grange, President of the Institute of France, pronounced his eulogy on 31 March 1954. A plate decorated with a medallion portrait by Spanish sculptor Enrique Pérez Comendador is affixed to his house at 11 Villa d'Alesia. A major retrospective exhibition of his works was held at the Grand Palais from 21 May to 12 June 1955.

== Reception ==
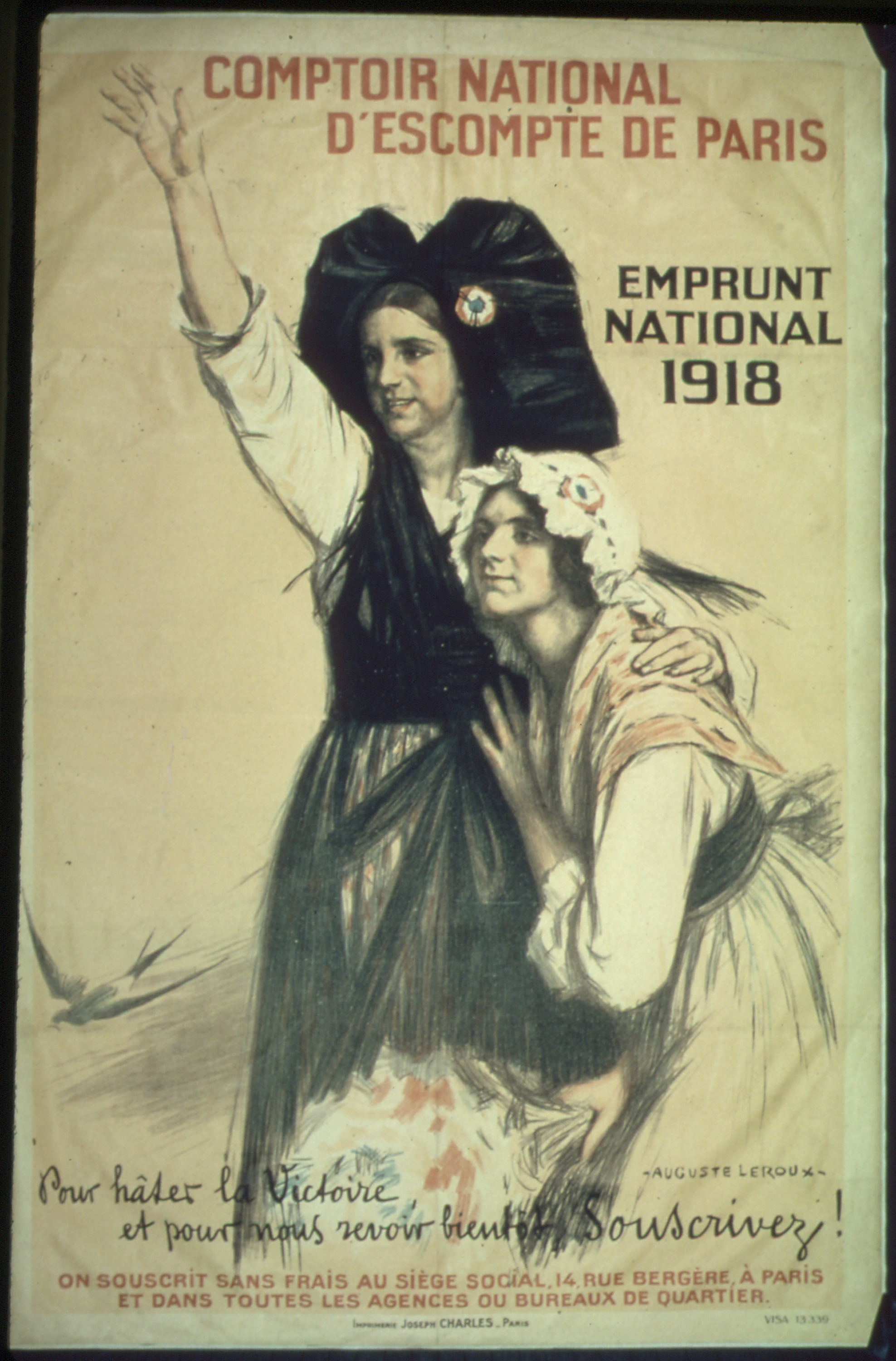
Poster for war loan by Comptoir national d'escompte de Paris, 1918

Leroux exhibited in several galleries in Paris including the Galerie Allard, Galerie Georges Petit, Galerie Charpentier and Galerie Mona Lisa. He also executed the plans of several public buildings and created some images for the mosaic of the Church of the Sacred Heart of Montmartre. These were four characters for the Lady Chapel: Saint Dominic de Guzmán, Saint Bernard of Clairvaux, John Eudes and Louis-Marie Grignon de Montfort.

Auguste Leroux was a great success as an illustrator of works by authors such as Giacomo Casanova, Joris-Karl Huysmans, Honoré de Balzac, Gustave Flaubert, Stendhal and Anatole France. These editions are highly prized by bibliophiles. A skilled lithographer, he worked with the greatest engravers of his time including Gusman, Eugène Decisy, Raoul Serres, Florian and Perrichon. His first works were full of symbolism and art nouveau mixed with many references to mythological and allegorical subjects. His later works show greater academic rigor and an obvious fascination for the female anatomy. They are now sought after by fans, especially his portraits and his ballerinas. Recently, several paintings by Auguste Leroux were sold on the market following the public sale of his studio by his descendants.

== Family ==
=== Younger brother ===
His younger brother Georges Paul Leroux (3 August 1877 – 16 February 1957) was also a brilliant artist who won the Prix de Rome in painting in 1906 and was a member of the Académie des beaux-arts.

=== Children ===
Auguste Leroux had three children, each of whom received complete training as artists and became well known in their own right.

Madeleine Leroux (Magdalena De Perez Leroux Comendador) (Paris, 1902 – Hervás, 1984) studied with her father and with Ferdinand Humbert at the École nationale supérieure des Beaux-Arts in Paris. She exhibited at the age of 21 at the Salon des Artistes Français (1923 – Summer Evening at the Carrousel). She won a Gold Medal at the Salon of French artists in 1926 and the Prix de Rome in 1927. She continued her training at the Casa de Velázquez in Madrid, and in 1931 married in Paris the Spanish sculptor Enrique Pérez Comendador (1900–1981). She pursued a successful career in Spain with her husband (exhibitions in Madrid, Barcelona, Paris, Cairo ....). A museum is entirely devoted to her in Hervás, in the province of Cáceres.

Lucienne Leroux (1903–1981) was a pupil of her father and Ferdinand Humbert at the École nationale supérieure des Beaux-Arts. She won the Prix de Rome in 1926 with The Family, Silver medal at the Salon of French artists in 1924, Gold medal at the Paris International Exhibition in 1937. She was a resident of the Casa de Velázquez in Madrid in 1935. Painter of composition, classical influence (Vénus chez Vulcain), her touch is sometimes more impressionistic (On the River – 1920). Spain was a great source of inspiration for her, shown in paintings such as View of Toledo. She was a teacher in Dijon and then in Paris. Until his death she had extreme admiration for her brother, André.

André Leroux (Paris, 1911 – Nogent-sur-Marne, 1997) was a pupil of his father and of Peter and Paul Albert Laurens. At 18, he was received at the first entrance exam of the École nationale supérieure des Beaux-Arts. At the age of 23 his painting The Eternal Epic earned him the congratulations of President Albert Lebrun. He won the Leguay-Lebrun prize of the Institute of France and Great Gold Medal. A painter of figures and of history, still lifes (Bouquet of Peonies 1968), portraits (Antonio Madrid 1946; Portrait of Manuela del Rio 1947), his classicism and romanticism (1930 Serenity) are far removed from the art movements of his day. With virtuosity, knowledge of composition, hard work: the desire for perfection was his only concern. He spent four years over The Eternal Epic. Among his major works were: David victorious over Goliath - 1932; Christ at the Sepulchre - 1933 Ophelia - 1934; Into the Light - 1936; Phantom of Glory - 1938 (after a poem by Alphonse de Lamartine). He was appointed professor at the National School of Fine Arts.
