= Hubei Institute of Fine Arts =

Art university in China

- 湖北美术学院
- Other name: HIFA
- Former names: Chinese Name: 武昌艺术专科学校; English Name: Wuchang College of Arts; French Name: École spéciale des Beaux-Arts de Ou Tchang
- Motto: 崇德 笃学 敏行 致美
- Motto in English: Morality, Academic Progress, Action and Beauty
- Type: Public University
- Established: 1920
- Founders: Jiang Lanpu, Tang Yijing and Xu Ziheng (蒋兰圃、唐义精、徐子珩)
- President: Zhou Feng (周峰)
- Faculty: 400
- Students: 6,400
- Location: Wuhan, Hubei, China
- Campus: Urban, Suburban, 800 mu (亩)
- Website: english.hifa.edu.cn

Hubei Institute of Fine Arts (HIFA), simplified Chinese: 湖北美术学院; traditional Chinese: 湖北美術學院; pinyin: Húběi Měishù Xuéyuàn; colloquially 湖美, pinyin: Húměi) is an art university in China. It is the only top institution of higher learning in fine arts in central China. It is regarded as one of the best and most selective academies of fine arts in China. Its history dates back to 1920, making it the first private art school in modern China. As one of the three oldest art universities, it is also one of the cradles of higher education of fine arts in modern China. It is located in Hubei Province's capital Wuhan, known as "the thoroughfare leading to nine provinces". Located in Wuhan, the industrial, economic and cultural center of central China, Hubei Institute of Fine Arts is widely regarded as a top academy of multiple disciplines, including watercolor painting, Chinese painting, oil painting, mural painting, mixed media painting, printmaking, sculpture, etc. HIFA has two campuses (Tanhualin campus and Canglongdao campus) and covers more than 488,000 square meters, which hold more than 500 faculty and staff members and more than 7,000 students.

== History ==
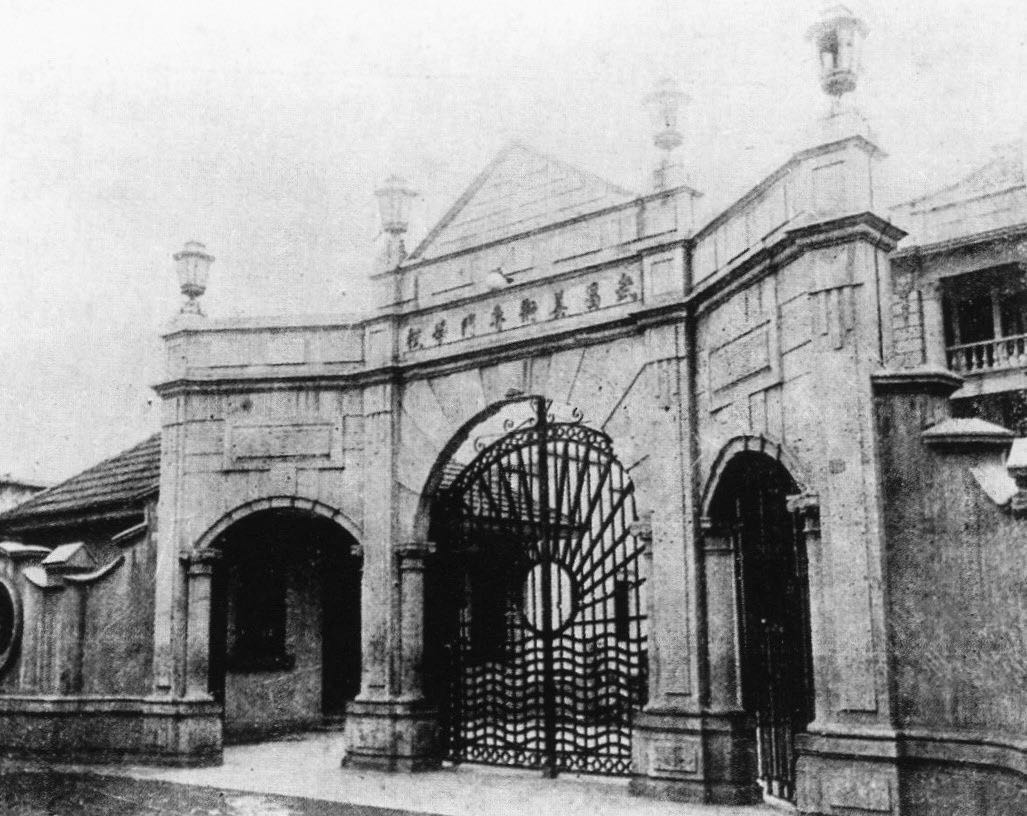
Wuchang College of Arts

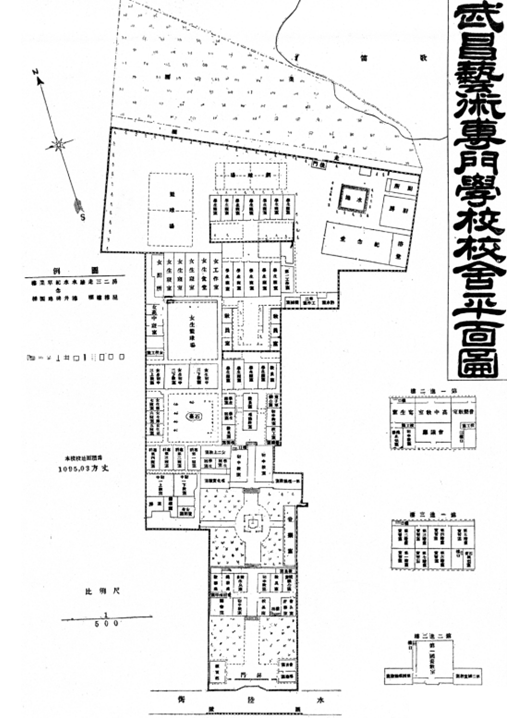
Site plan of Wuchang College of Arts

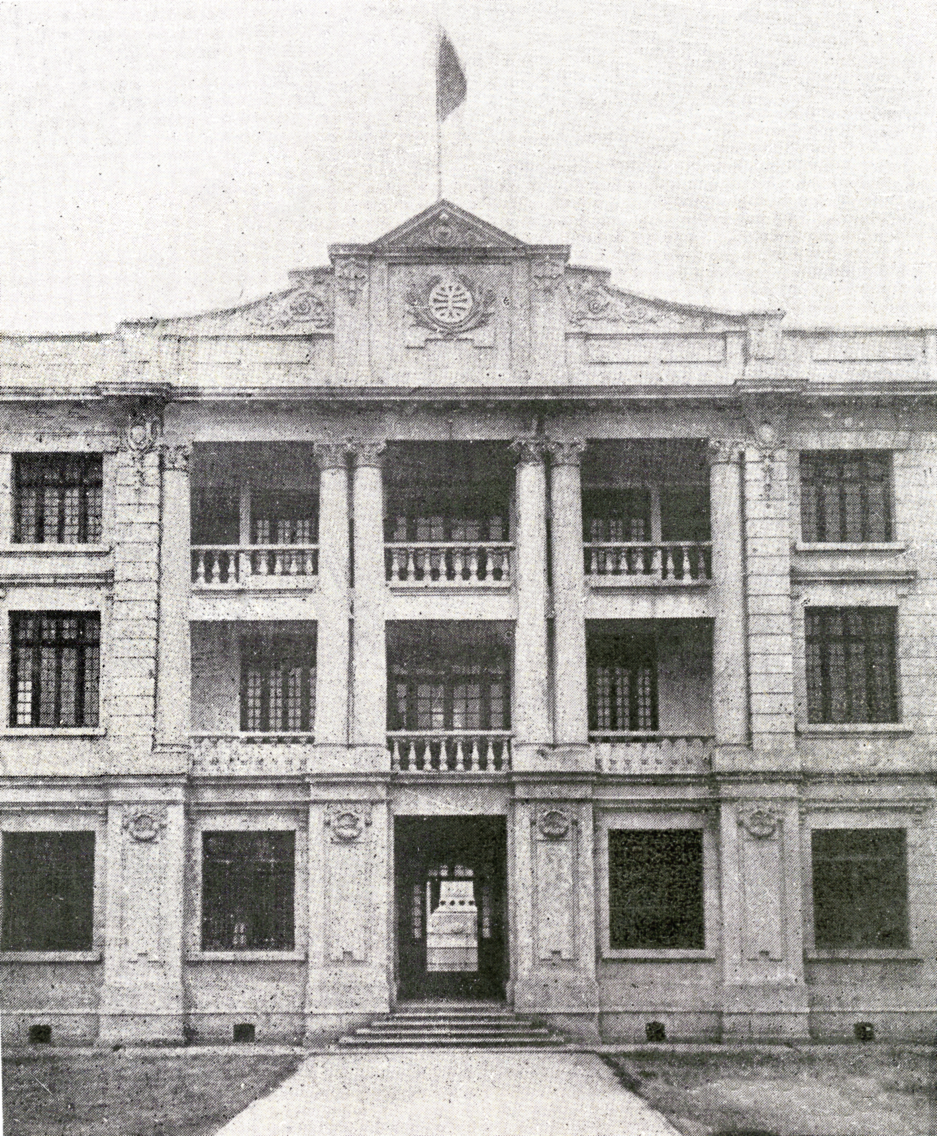
Administrative office building, 1926

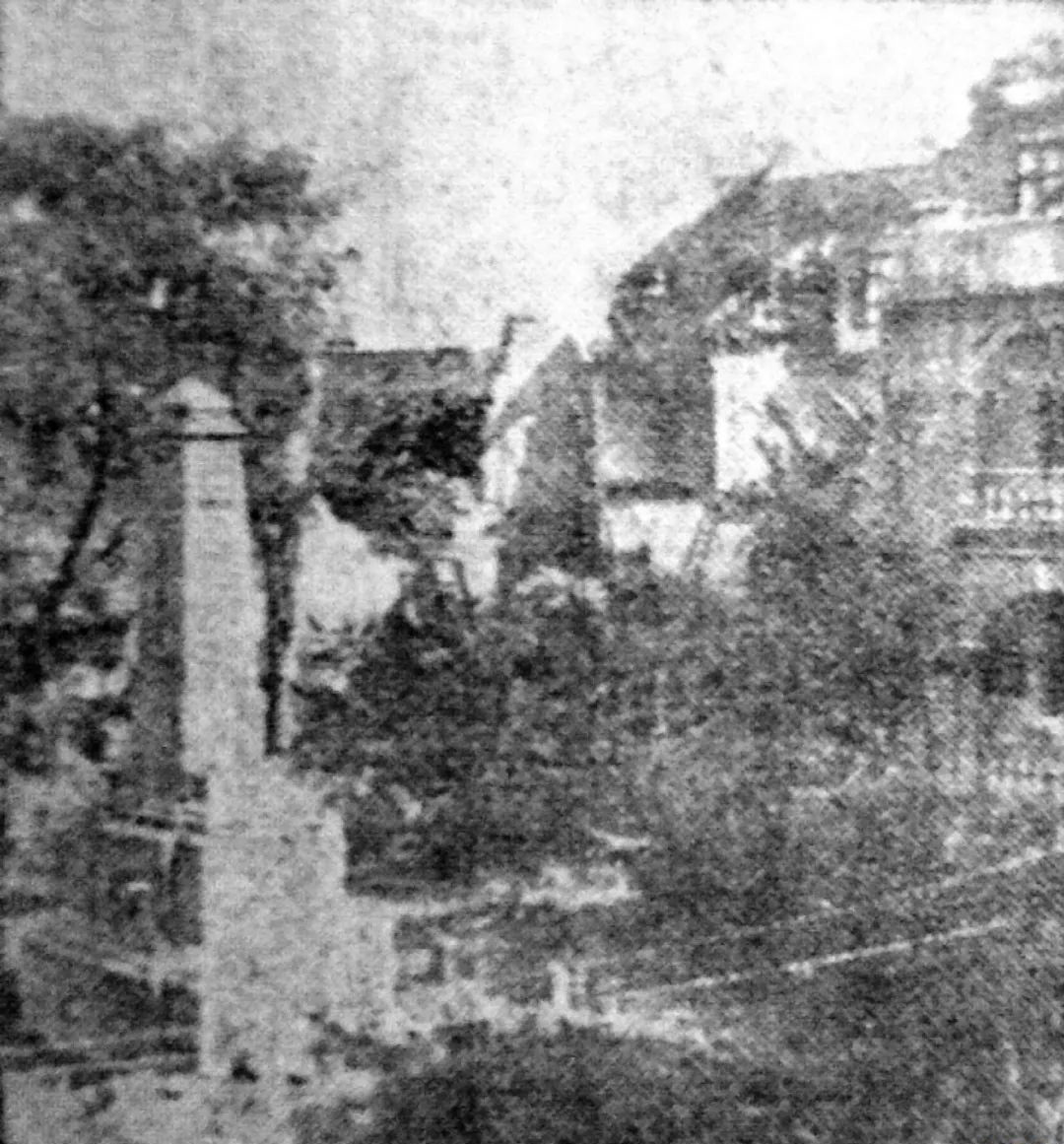
Campus after Japanese bombing in 1938

The academy dates back to Wuchang Fine Arts School (simplified Chinese: 武昌美术学校; traditional Chinese: 武昌美術學校; pinyin: Wǔchāng Měishù Xuéxiào), which was founded in 1920 by Jiang Lanpu, Tang Yijing and Xu Ziheng. In 1923, it was renamed Wuchang Specialised School of Fine Arts(simplified Chinese: 武昌美术专门学校; traditional Chinese: 武昌美術專門學校; pinyin: Wǔchāng Měishù Zhuānmén Xuéxiào) and became one of the three oldest art academies in modern China. In 1930, it was renamed Private Wuchang College of Arts (simplified Chinese: 私立武昌艺术专科学校; traditional Chinese: 私立武昌藝術專科學校; pinyin: Sīlì Wǔchāng Yìshù Zhuānkē Xuéxiào). In the mid-1930s, the college reached the heyday in terms of size, talent training and academic achievements, and became one of the most important art education bases in China.

During the Second World War, the school—an important stronghold of anti-fascist propaganda—was destroyed in a Japanese bombing in 1938. Following repeated attacks by Japanese forces, it was forced to relocate westward. The school settled at Wushisanti, Deganba Town, Jiangjin County in Sichuan Province, after taking refuge in Gulaobei of Yidu and Dingshengquan Temple in Jiangjin County. In 1945 when the Anti-Japanese War was over, the school moved back to Wuhan. Despite the great difficulties during the anti-Japanese war, the college reached its another peak of development. The college made tremendous contributions to the establishment and development of the modern art education in China and laid the solid foundation for the art education in PRC.

After the founding of PRC in 1949, Wu Chang College of Fine Arts was merged into Central Plains University (simplified Chinese: 中原大学; traditional Chinese: 中原大學; pinyin: Zhōngyuán Dàxué), Central South College of Fine Arts (Chinese: 中南美术专科学校; simplified Chinese: 中南美术专科学校; traditional Chinese: 中南美術專科學校; pinyin: zhōng nán měi shù zhuān kē xué xiào), and Hubei Education College (simplified Chinese: 湖北教育学院; traditional Chinese: 湖北教育學院; pinyin: Húběi Jiàoyù Xuéyuàn) and Central China Normal College (simplified Chinese: 华中师范学院; traditional Chinese: 華中師範學院; pinyin: Huázhōng Shīfàn Xuéyuàn) successively. In 1977, it developed into an independent college——Hubei Art Academy (simplified Chinese: 湖北艺术学院; traditional Chinese: 湖北藝術學院; pinyin: Húběi Yìshù Xuéyuàn), which consisted of the Fine Arts Division and the Music Division.

In 1985, with the approval of the then State Education Commission, the Fine Arts Division of Hubei Art Academy became Hubei Institute of Fine Arts, shaping the new setup of higher education of fine arts in contemporary China and opening the new chapter of development in the history of the academy.

== Academic profile ==
HIFA has 15 undergraduate faculties, 24 undergraduate degree programs and 34 majors, covering the fields of Fine Arts, Design, Art Theory, Theater and Film & Television Media Studies, Pedagogy, Business Administration, Mechanical Engineering and Architecture. It has set up a curriculum system with art-related disciplines as the majority, and Pedagogy, Engineering as well as Management disciplines supporting each other. HIFA awards a master's degree in three first-level disciplines i.e. Fine Arts, Design and Art Theory, all of which are key disciplines of Hubei Province. In 2005, approved by Office of the State Council Academic Degrees Committee, HIFA established the Master of Arts (MFA) program as one of the first 32 higher education institutions awarding this professional degree. In 2018, HIFA and its first-level discipline "Fine Arts" were selected for the "Domestic First-Class Discipline Construction" plan by the Hubei Provincial People's Government. In 2019, six programs including Painting, Sculpture, Visual Communication Design, Environmental Art & Design, Product Design, Fashion and Apparel Design were listed among National First-class Undergraduate Program Development Centers (the First Batch), accounting for one fourth of the programs offered by HIFA; eight programs includingChinese Painting and Art History and Theory were listed among Provincial First-class Undergraduate Program Development Centers (the First Batch), making up one third of the total number.

Currently, HIFA has 14 staff enjoying special allowance from the State Council, nine Young and Middle-aged Experts with Outstanding Contributions, 18 staff enjoying special allowance from the provincial government, three candidates for the Hubei New Century High-Level Talent Project, two "Professors in Hubei Industry", three chair professors appointed as "Chutian Scholar", as well as 262 guest (adjunct) professors and candidates of high-level special lectures. For undergraduate education, HIFA has three Characteristic Disciplines granted by the Ministry of Education, two National Quality Courses, one National Talent Cultivating Mode Innovation and Experimental Zone, one "Pilot Project for Discipline Reform" of higher education institutions under the Ministry of Education, one National Project of Off-campus Practice Education Base for college students, two projects approved as National Quality Resource Sharing Courses, one project for support and cooperation between Higher Education Institutions(HEIs) under Central Ministries & Agencies and HEIs under Local Authorities, 85 National Innovation and Entrepreneurship Training Projects for College Students, and 67 projects under the provincial "Quality Project" and "Undergraduate Education Project" construction.

== Partner institutions ==
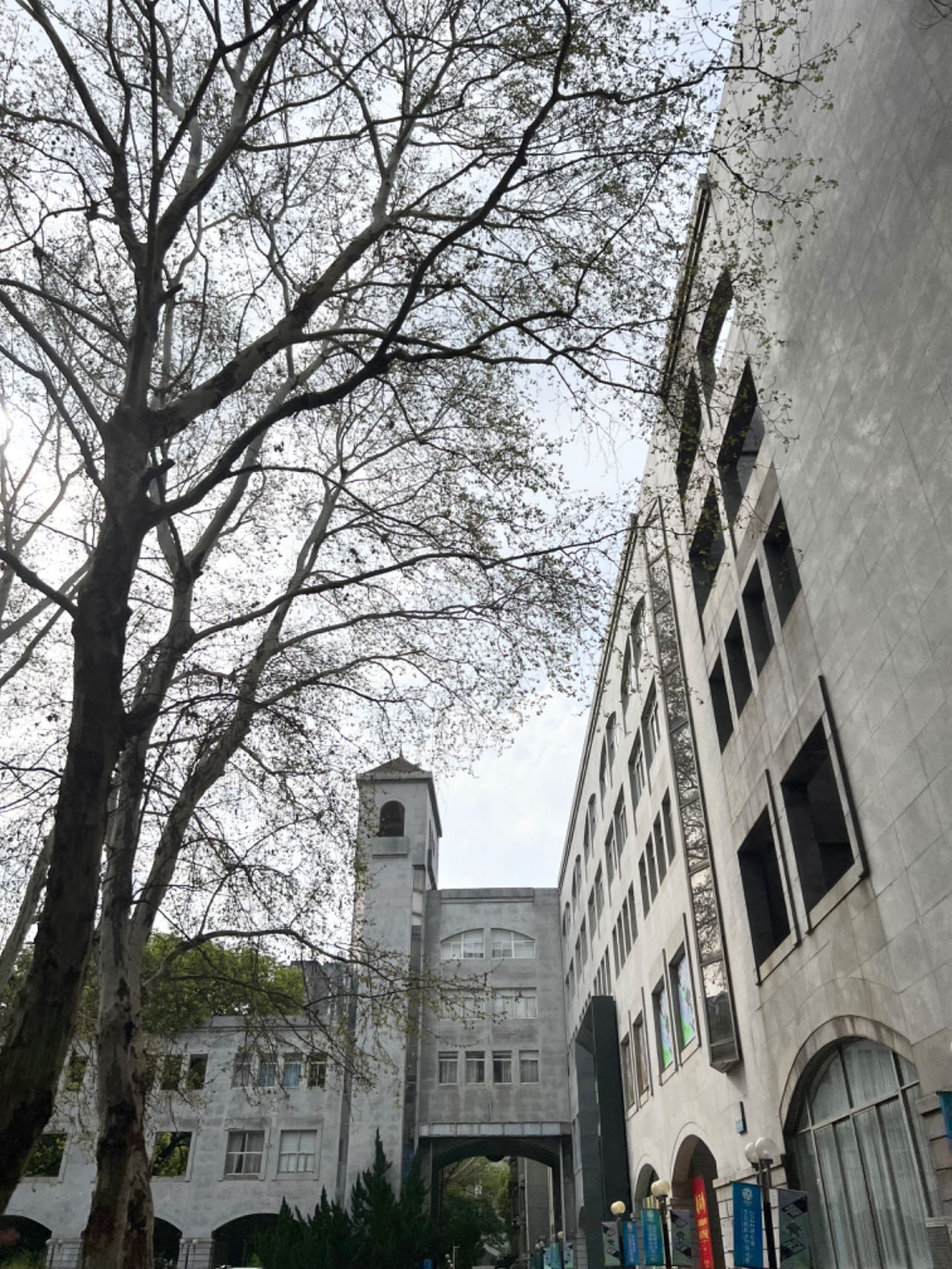
Tanhualin Campus

- University of Washington
- University of Saskatchewan
- Deutsch-chinesischer Kulturaustausch fuer Kunset und Design e.v., DCKD
- Brand University of Applied Sciences
- Accademia di belle arti Roma
- Accademia di belle arti di Napoli
- Marche Polytechnic University
- Nuova Accademia Di Belle Arti
- Polimoda International Institute of Fashion Design & Marketing
- University of Applied Sciences - FH JOANNEUM
- Jan Matejko Academy of Fine Arts
- École Supérieure d'Art et Design de Saint-Étienne - Esadse
- Institut d'études supérieures des arts
- AD Education
- Moscow State Academic Art Institute Named after V.I.SURIKOV
- Moscow State Stroganov Academy of Design and Applied Arts (Stroganov Academy)
- Lucerne University of Applied Sciences and Arts
- Graz University of Technology
- Hongik University
- Chun-Ang University
- Hanseo University
- Hanyang University
- Sungshin University
- Tokyo University of the Arts
- Raffles Design Institute
- Burapha University
- Manchester Metropolitan University
- University of Wales Trinity Saint David
- University for the Creative Arts
- Universidade da cidade de Macau
- Autonomous University of Queretaro
- Federal University of Parana
- National Taiwan University of Arts
- Hungarian University of Fine Arts

== Research centers ==
- The Research Center for Modern Public Visual Arts and Design
- The Collaborative Innovation Center of Public Art
- The Idea Fashion Arts Center
- The Research Center for Hubei Intangible Cultural Heritage
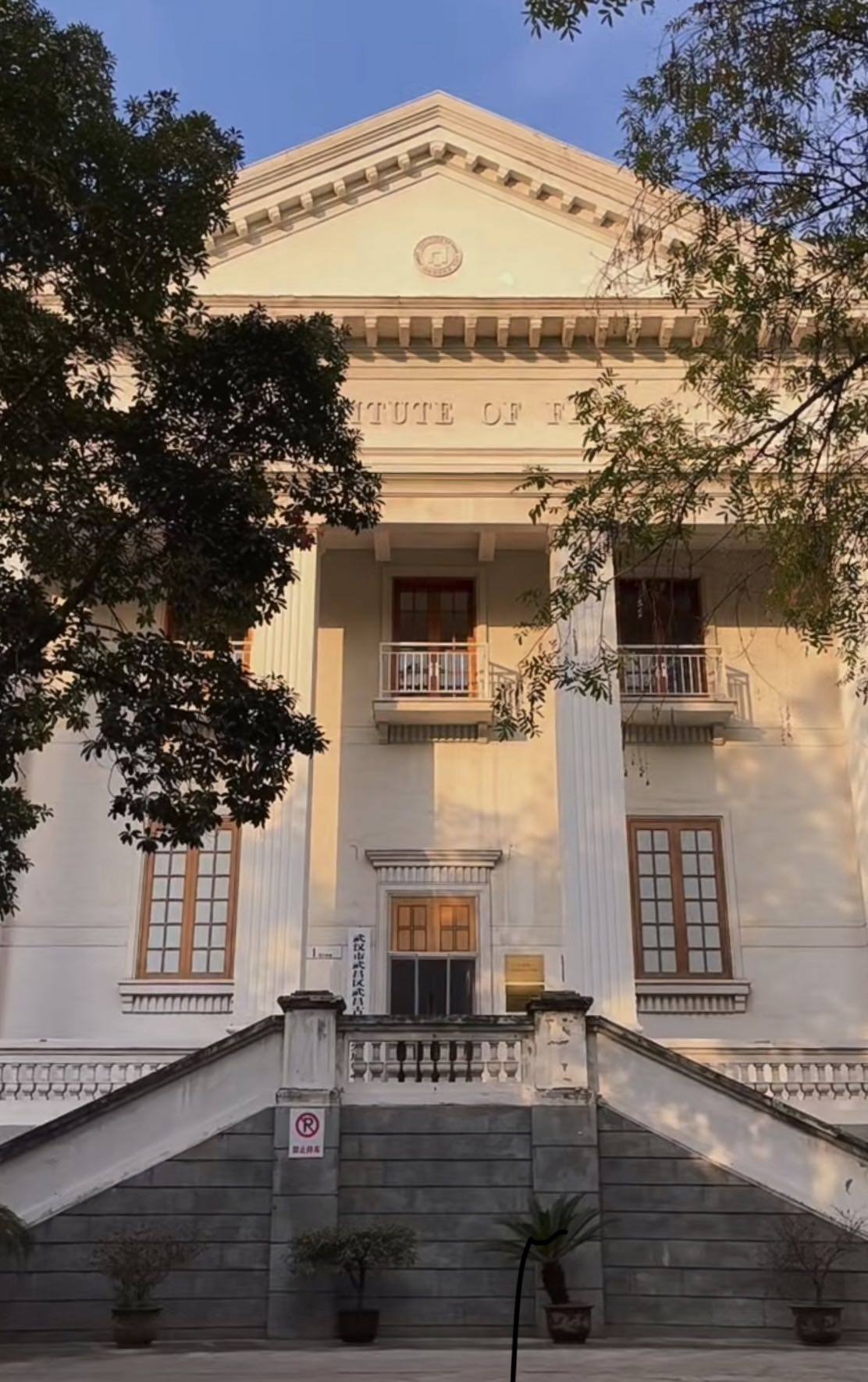
- Tanhualin Campus
  The Research Center for Arts and Crafts' Culture of HIFA

== Notable teachers ==
- Wen Yiduo
- He luting
- Tang Yihe
- Guan Liang
- Xian Xinhai
- Lü Ji
- Ni Yide
- Wei Guangqing
- Shang Yang
- Cao Dan

== Notable alumni ==
- Zeng Fanzhi
- Tang Yihe
- Zhou Lingzhao
- Ma Liuming
- Cao Dan
- Liu Shouxiang
- Shang Yang
- Chu Tat-shing
- Shi Jinsong
- Ding Shiue-ju
- Ho Huai-shuo
- Liu Chuang
- Ge Yulu

== See also ==
- Chinese fine art
