= Shiy De-jinn =

Chinese modernist painter

- Traditional Chinese: 席德進
- Simplified Chinese: 席德进
Transcriptions
Standard Mandarin
- Hanyu Pinyin: Xí Déjìn
- Wade–Giles: Hsi^{2} Tê^{2}-chin^{4}
- IPA: [ɕǐ tɤ̌.tɕîn]

Shiy De-jinn 席德進 (1923–1981; pinyin: Xí Déjìn) was a Chinese modernist artist who became prominent in Taiwan. Born in Sichuan, he was a student of Lin Fengmian and Pang Xunqin. Fleeing the Chinese Communist Party to Taiwan, he lived there until his death. He has attracted interested as a nativist and, especially posthumously, as a queer artist. In terms of his creative style, he's heavily influenced by French artist Bernard Buffet.

His works are held at Museum of Contemporary Art Taipei and the Taipei Fine Arts Museum.
