= Ni Yide =

- Born: 1901
- Died: 1970 (aged 68–69)
- Known for: painting, writing
- Notable work: Summer 1935 and Still life 1932
- Movement: Chinese modernism

Ni Yide (1901–1970) was a Chinese modernist painter, writer and art critic.

== Artistic career ==
He was in the major of Western painting at the Shanghai Academy of Fine Arts starting in the year of 1919. Then, he graduated in 1922 from the earliest training ground for modern Western art in China, the Shanghai Art School. He became a professor at the Shanghai Art Academy upon his graduation. He continued his studies in Western art and art history in Tokyo at the Kubwata Painting school under Fujishima Takeji, and organized the Fine Arts Research Society of Chinese Students in Japan with Wang Daoyuan to undertake advanced research on Japanese and Western art history and theory in 1927. After his period of study abroad from 1927 to 1928, Ni returned to China to protest the Japanese military incursion into Shandong that led to the "Jinan Massacre". As the Anti-Japanese War comes up afterward, Ni Yide becomes acting head of the fine arts section of the Third Department under the KMT's Military Commissions political department. He kept developing painting related to classicism and modernism, and teaching at Gangzhou Municipal Art School, then at the Wuchang College of Art in Hubei (Today's Hubei Institute of Fine Arts). By 1930, he was an art critic, theorist, and creative writer, as well as an oil painter. In 1931 Ni, Pang Xunqin (1906–1985), and five other modernist painters formed the Storm society to promote modern Western art's influence on Chinese art. Ni Yi-de helped write the group's manifesto. During that time period of the 1930s, Ni Yide believed in a conception of "integrating Western and Chinese" art, in which an oil painting must express both Chinese atmosphere and Western painting to preserve the original meaning and forms of both.

Fauvism is what Ni Yide's artworks tend to demonstrate in the 1920s and 1930s, such as the oil painting "Wharf". He uses the structure of subjects and crude brushstrokes for paintings fearlessly and is not bothered by the restraint of color contrasts or a unified timbre, which shows his excessively lyrical interpretation of Fauvism.

During Republican China's wartime, which is from 1937 to 1949, all the Japan-trained painters, including Ni Yide and his contemporaries practicing Western-style painting, were immersed in an agitative discourse. It presented contradictory and hesitant narratives of artistic theories; Ni Yide's adoption of neo-realism and stylistic changes is one piece of evidence. The oil painting "Wharf" mentioned in the previous paragraph and "Portrait of a Worker" painted by Ni Yide show his shift toward art that could engage with social experience because the subjects of these two paitnings are construction place and working-class. In light of his wartime actions, it is reasonable to say that he first reinterpreted neo-realism as a means of expressing national resistance and the realities of modern society, then kept exploring the integration of Western oil painting and Chinese art.

The Storm Society wanted to be unrestrained by past conventions in art such as limitations by nature. They said that art is not a slave of religion or literature. The storm society exhibited works inspired by European styles such as Fauvism, Cubism, symbolism, expressionism, futurism, abstractionism and surrealism. Their works were featured in Shanghai newspapers and magazines such as Liangyou, Meishije and Shidai.

Ni was also a member of the Muse society at the Shanghai Art Academy. They published l'Art Journal, which provided a venue for its manifesto and most of its exhibition news. One of his paintings, "Summer" (1932) was cubist-inspired. In 1941, Ni set up Nitian Studio in Chongqing.

On December 8, 1942, the day after the Pearl Harbor attacks, Japanese encroachment caused the 10 members of the Storm Society to flee south. In 1944, he became a professor at NAA in Chongqing. In 1945 Ni Yide, Din Yangyong (1902-1978), and a few other artists exhibited their works at the Chinese Modern painting exhibition (Zhongguo Xiandai huihan zhan) organized by Zao Wouki (1921-2013) in Chongqing. After World War II, Yide became part of the nine person art society in Shanghai. In 1949, Ni became a professor and vice president of ZAFA (Zhejang Academy of Fine Arts). In 1953, Ni transferred to teach at CAFA (Central Academy of Fine Arts) China. In 1955, Ni became a director of the editing department of Meishu. In 1961, Ni set up a studio in ZAFA, Hangzhou.

== Writing career ==
As a writer, Ni Yide used his considerable literary skills to defend stylistic innovation and personal creativity as the essentials for a modern art in modern China. In the 2nd national art exhibition of China, Ni Yide criticized the judges for their conservative bias, and dismissed "official art" with the argument that in France real progress always came outside of the government salon. An additional fact about a salon Ni Yide participated in 1920s is that there was an influence from the Communist Revolution spread in the literary field in the late 1920s; however, that did not make Ni Yide follow the tendencies of the radical left, and he remained contrary to his allies involved in the Creation Society --- an influential literary salon he joined in the early 1920s for writing new-style poetry and romance novels.

Ni Yide wrote an article defending Qui Ti (1906-1958), a Storm society member who received criticism from realists for a still life of flowers she painted. He wrote an article on Pan Tianshou’s (1897-1971) bird and flower landscapes where he described ‘Bathed in Dew’ as poetical and ‘After the Rain’ where he mentions for example, “...the crimson flowers with their stately leaves appear pure and noble, lovely and gentle and above all lyrical in their beauty”. He uses strong imagery. According to Yide “ ...If we want to exhibit our national heritage, I believe, landscape painting is the most suitable subject. Chinese landscapes in every place possess indigenous Chinese traits.

== Political career ==
In the study of Professor Juliane Noth of East Asian Art History at Freie Universität Berlin, Ni Yide is seen as a senior art professor at the China Academy of Art who had renounced his modernist aspirations to become a communist during the war.

In 1938, Ni Yide joined the Third Bureau of the Political Department of the Military Commission of the Nationalist Government—a state-level agency for artistic propaganda—in Wuhan. That year, he was tasked with overseeing artistic propaganda for the war of resistance against Japan and helped design *Defend Greater Wuhan*, the largest anti-war mural of the period. Located at the Yellow Crane Tower in Wuhan (which was destroyed in 1955), the mural depicted General Chiang Kai-shek on horseback, heroically leading his troops against the invaders. In 1949, Ni Yide was transferred to the East China Branch of the Central Academy of Fine Arts in Hangzhou, serving as a representative of the Chinese Communist forces; he also stood as a key witness to the conclusion of the modern art movement that had unfolded under Nationalist rule. During the Cultural Revolution (1966–1976), he was subjected to brutal persecution at the Zhejiang Academy of Fine Arts due to his earlier involvement with the Republican government in the late 1930s.
