= Paul Albert Laurens =

French painter (1870–1934)

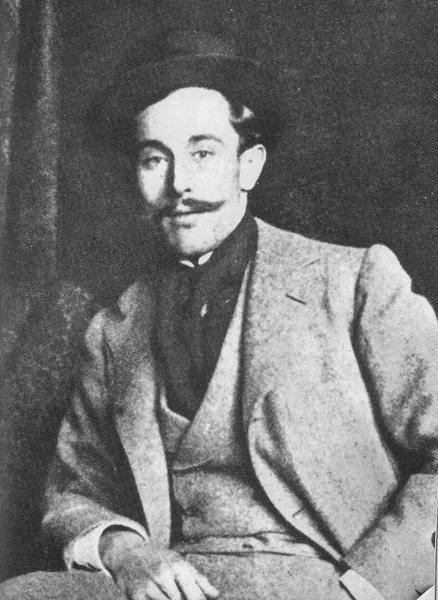
- Photograph from 1893 (Fondation Catherine Gide)
- Born: Paul Albert Laurens; 18 January 1870; Paris, France
- Died: 27 September 1934 (aged 64); Toulon, Department of Var, France
- Known for: Painting, drawing

Paul Albert Laurens (18 January 1870 – 27 September 1934) was a French painter.

== Biography ==
Laurens was the eldest son of painter Jean-Paul Laurens (1838–1921), who was of humble origins, and his wife, Madeleine Willemsens (1848–1913). Laurens was born in Rue Taranne, off the Boulevard Saint-Germain in Paris, where his parents were living. Aware of the Franco-Prussian War of 1870, his father quickly moved his family back to the relative safety his native village, Fourquevaux in the Haute-Garonne department in southwestern France. The family home may still be found in the village today, near the church.

Laurens's younger brother, Jean-Pierre Laurens (1875–1932), was also a painter. Laurens attended school on Rue d'Assas where he met, among others, André Gide, and it was with Gide that he made his first trip to Biskra, Algeria, in 1894. Meanwhile, in 1890 the Académie Julian founded new workshops at 31 Rue du Dragon and Laurens and his brother were taught there alongside Paul Landowski and Henri Bouchard.

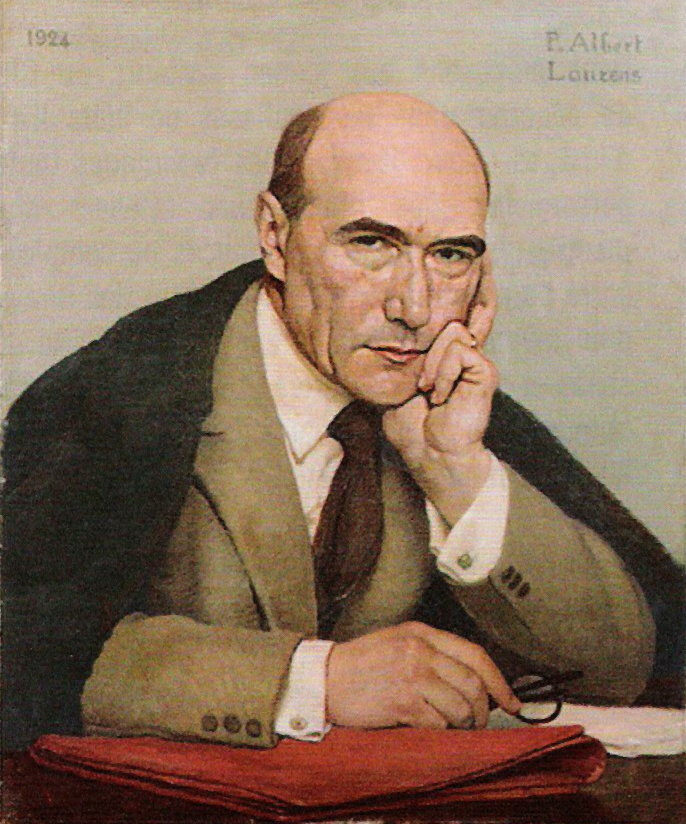
Portrait d'André Gide by Laurens (1924). Laurens and Gide were friends, and they lived for a time in Algeria.

On 18 October 1893 Laurens sailed from Marseille with his friend Gide bound for Tunis, and from there on to Sousse. In January 1894 Laurens and Gide settled in Biskra, in the former home of the White Fathers (Missionaries of Africa). Madame Gide, concerned about the health of her son, also joined them.

Laurens married Bertha Guerin in 1900 and moved with her to 126 Boulevard du Montparnasse, in the same building as the painter Émile-René Ménard.

Around 1912, with his father and a student of his, Ulysses Ravaut, Laurens worked to decorate the Capitole at the request of the municipality of Toulouse. During the First World War, he worked with other artists including Dunoyer de Segonzac, Forain, Georges Paul Leroux (brother of Auguste Leroux), Abel Truchet, Henri Callot, Avy and Devambez on camouflage within the armed forces and their work served as a model for the Allied armies.

== Academic career ==
Laurens was Professor of Drawing at the École Polytechnique between 1919 and 1934. He was appointed member of the French Academy of Fine Arts in 1933.

Among his students were Şeref Akdik, Jean Bertholle, Yvonne Kleiss-Herzig, René Marie Castaing, Robert Lepeltier, Raoul Dastrac, Albert Demarest, Monique Cras, Lucien Simon, Yvon Dieulafé, Roger Marius Debat, Lucien-Victor Delpy, Achener Maurice, Jean Jules Louis Cavaillès, Lucienne Capdevielle, André Leroux, Nicolas Untersteller, Feyhaman Duran, Fang Ganmin, Tang Yihe, Pierre Langlade and Dominique Frassati.

== Selected works ==
=== Paintings ===
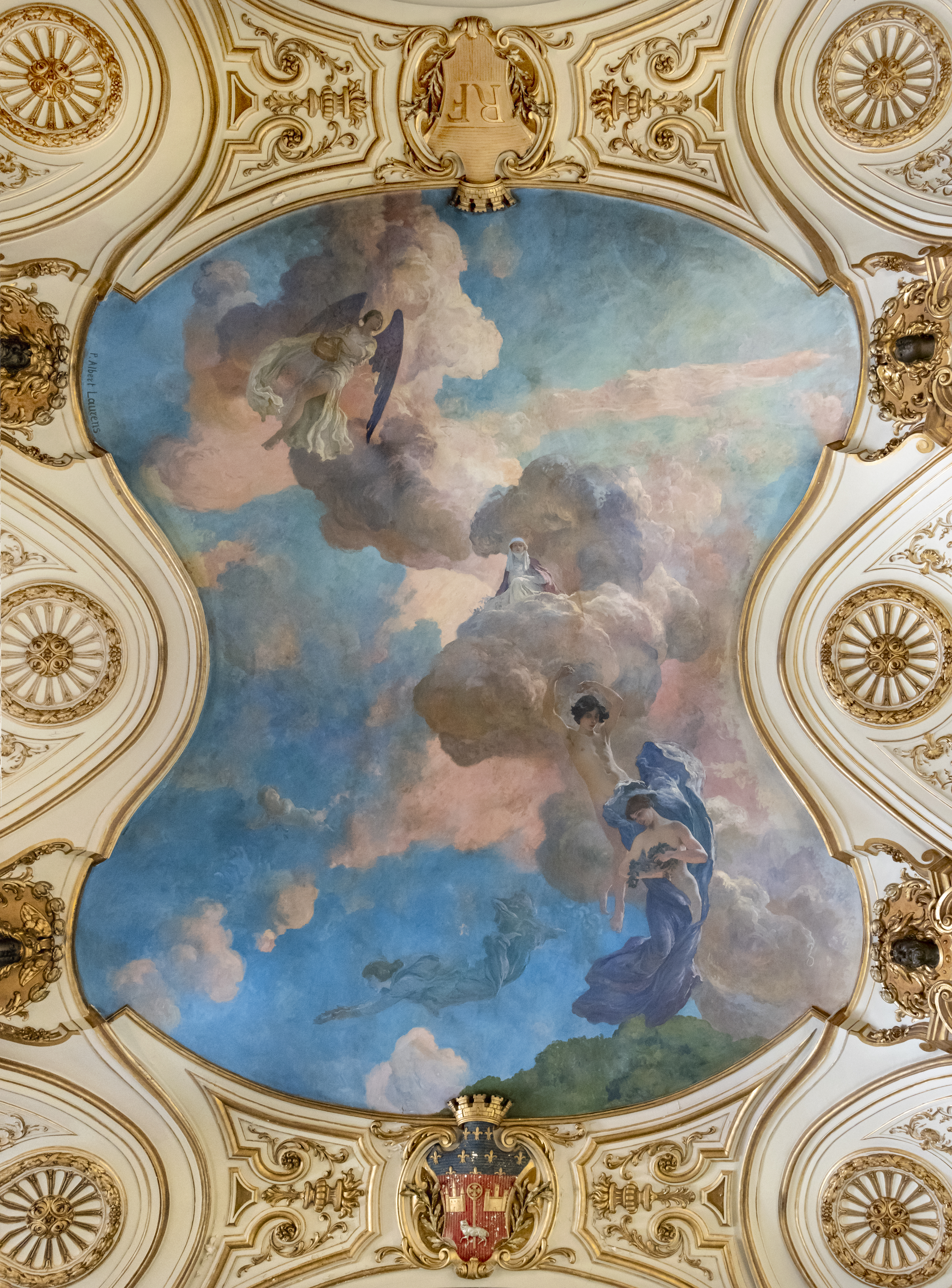
Triomphe de Clémence Isaure Capitole de Toulouse

- 1893: Les Saintes Femmes(oil on canvas), Salon No. 1052
- 1894: Rue a Tunis, (oil on board), 27 cm x 35 cm
- 1895: St. Paul (oil on canvas), Altar of the parish church of Saint-Germier, Fourquevaux
- c. 1895: Joueur de Tambour sur un Chameau (oil on canvas)
- c. 1895: La Maison du Baron d'Erlanger, Sidi Bou Saïd (oil on card), 19 cm x 24 cm
- 1896: La Dignitaure (oil on canvas), 46.5 cm x 35 cm
- 1897: La robe noire au col de dentelle (oil on canvas), 61 cm x 49 cm
- 1899: Vénus accueillie par les heures (oil on canvas)

not dated:

- Scène d'intérieur (oil on board), 35.5 cm x 26.4 cm
- Scene Galante in Pierrot (oil on card) 32.8 cm x 40.7 cm
- Fantasie (oil on canvas)
- Dans le Jardin de l'Amour (oil on canvas), 85.1 cm x 62.2 cm
- Femme nue et ses chiens (oil on canvas)
- Jeune femme assise au châle et aux orchidées (oil on canvas), 100 cm x 86 cm
- Jeune femme au bouquet de roses (oil on canvas), 46 cm x 38 cm
- Jeune femme à la Cascade (oil on canvas), 38 cm x 45 cm
- Bouquet de fleurs (oil on canvas), 35.5 cm x 26.3 cm
- Bouquet au pichet d'étain (oil on canvas), 27 cm x 22 cm
- Rose thé dans un verre oil on card), 27 cm x 21 cm
- Personnages de la Comédia dell'Arte (oil on canvas), 31 cm x 56 cm
- Paris (oil on board), 34.5 cm x 30.5 cm
- Pierrot attablé (oil on canvas), 33 cm x 46 cm
- Pierrot sous la Tonnelle (oil on canvas), 61 cm x 50 cm
- Colombine et Pierrot (oil on card), 40 cm x 33 cm
- Amoureux au clair de Lune (oil on canvas), 54 cm x 46 cm
- Danseuses (oil on paper, card), 39.5 cm x 49.5 cm
- Une élégante au bord de la rivière (oil on canvas), 61 cm x 50.8 cm
- Après la Baignade (oil on canvas), 46 cm x 55 cm
- Conversation au crépuscule (oil on canvas), 55 cm x 46 cm
- Les Caravaniers (oil on canvas), 61 cm x 60 cm
- Dame élégante dans un parc (oil on card), 35.6 cm x 25.4 cm
- Scène symboliste (oil on canvas), 53 cm x 2.60m
- Terrasse en Provence (oil on canvas), 56 cm x 46 cm
- Terrasse dans le Midi (oil on canvas), 55 cm x 46 cm
- Tête de jeune fille (oil on canvas), 46 cm x 38 cm
- 1900: Solitude, 86 cm x 146.5 cm, Salon n°763, Musée de Brou à Bourg-en-Bresse
- 1900: Portrait de Jean-Paul Laurens, the artist's father, 61 cm x 50 cm, Musée du Louvre, acquired by the state for Luxembourg in 1902
- 1910: Didon (oil on canvas)
- c. 1911: Le Salon Jaune (oil on canvas), 55 cm x 46 cm, Musée de Laval
- 1911: La Dame en Bleu (oil on canvas), exhibited at the Salon of 1911
- Elégante au châle bleu (oil on canvas), 54 cm x 45 cm
- Le Châle Vert (oil on canvas), 55 cm x 45 cm
- La Danseuse (oil on canvas), 72 cm x 48 cm
- Jeune femme à la robe longue devant un escalier, card, 45 cm x 37 cm
- La Crique de l'Apothicaire (oil on canvas), 51 cm x 61 cm
- 1912: Suzanne (oil on canvas), exhibited at the Salon
- c. 1912: Triomphe de Clémence Isaure, oil on ceiling of the grand staircase at the Capitole de Toulouse (Mayor of Toulouse)
- c. 1912: La Poésie, oil at the Capitole de Toulouse
- c. 1912: La Musique, oil at the Capitole de Toulouse
- c. 1912: Jeune musicien et Danseuse, fragment of a decorative panel for Toulouse Town Hall and exhibited at the Salon of 1913
- 1913: Les Soupirants (oil on canvas), exhibited at the Salon of 1913
- 1914: Divertissement dans un parc (oil on canvas), 39 cm x 46 cm, exhibited at the Salon of 1914
- 1920: Travest (oil on canvas), 92 cm X 60 cm, Musée du Petit-Palais in Paris
- Portrait d'Émile Picard (1856-1941) (oil on canvas), Member of the French Academy of Sciences
- 1923: Portrait de Famille (oil on canvas), the artist and his family, 1.65 m x 1.84 m, donated by the artist to Luxembourg in 1931
- 1924: André Gide (oil on canvas), 61 cm x 50 cm, writer (1869-1951), acquired by the state for Luxembourg in 1928
- c. 1925: La Robe d'Argen (oil on canvas), 73 cm x 50 cm, acquired by the state
- c. 1929: Portrait de Jacques Copeau (1879-1949), writer and actor, 84 cm x 29 cm, Musée des Beaux-Arts Dijon

=== Drawings, Watercolours, Lithographs ===
- c. 1895: Portrait of Andre Gide, Gide in his youth, the mustachioed romantic pose (etching) 44 cm x 30 cm
- c. 1900: Le Duc d'Albe demande l'absolution au Pape Paul IV (watercolour), 30 cm x 18 cm, preparatory to photoengraving published by Goupil 1900.
- c. 1900: Arrestation de Don Carlos par son père Philippe II d'Espagne (watercolour), 30 cm x 18 cm
- c. 1900: Un Roi de Navarre devant la présentation des couleurs (watercolour), 30 cm x 17 cm
- c. 1900: Louis XIV découvre le portrait de Mme de Lavallière chez le Surintendant Fouquet (watercolor), 30 cm x 17 cm
- (not dated): Portrait d’Andre Gide de profil (drawing, watercolour, ink on paper), 22 cm x 17 cm
- (not dated): La Ronde (drawing, watercolour, charcoal), 40 cm x 48 cm
- c. 1900: Réception d'Elisabeth de Valois par Philippe II d'Espagne, (watercolour), 30cm x 17cm
- c. 1900: Don Juan reconnu par Philippe II d'Espagne, (watercolour), 30 cm x 17 cm
- c. 1900: Un roi de France sur un champ de bataille (watercolour), 17.5 cm x 30 cm
- 1903: Papillons (pastel)
- 1924: Portrait de André Gide
- 1930: Avion survolant Marseil, design for a postage stamp, engraver Abel Mignon, face value 1f 50. blue
- 1932: La Paix, Allegory of the Republic, Phrygian cap and holding an olive branch (symbolizing peace), in her left hand, right hand on the hilt of her sword in its scabbard. At the request of André Tardieu, Chairman of the Board at the Post Office. Printing by Antonin Delzers.

=== Posters ===
- (not dated): ’’Ramses’’, 91.5 cm x 53 cm,
- 1926: Theatre de la Gaite: ‘’Wounded Spaniards’’
- (not dated): ‘’Blessed Spanish” 82 cm x 60 cm

=== Illustrations ===
- 1898: Lêda ou la louange des bienheureuses ténèbres by Pierre Louÿs, Paris, Editions of the Mercure de France, with ten colour drawings by Laurens, five large ornate initials and vignettes at the end of five chapters
- 1900: Thaïs d'Anatole France ed. by A. Ramagnol, compositions by Laurens, engraving and etching by Léon Boisson
- 1904: La Morte amoureuse Paris Romagnol, illustrations by Laurens in three states
- (not dated): Les Romanesques de Edmond Rostand, Paris Libr., Pierre Lafitte & Co, "Complete Works Illustrated", 100pp. in four books, adorned with a frontispiece and partially illustrated in colour, integrated with the text, Avy JM, Chabas Paul and Paul Albert Laurens, binding editor half brown leather, gilt title.
- 1910: Cyrano de Bergerac by Edmond Rostand, ed. Pierre Lafitte, illustrators: François Flaming, Albert Besnard, Auguste, F. Gorguet and Paul Albert Laurens.
- 1914: Les Caves du Vatican by André Gide, Paris, NRF, 1914, two volumes 8vo, half morocco with caramel corners, top edge gilt, decorated with a portrait of the author as a frontispiece to the soft ground by Paul Albert Laurens, Edition 550
- 1924: Thaïs by Anatole France 16 original etchings by Laurens for an edition of Thais

== Exhibitions ==
- 1893: Salon des artistes français, Les Saintes Femmes
- 1897: Salon Champs Élysées, Glauké et Thaleia
- 1899: Salon des artistes français, Vénus accueillie par les heures, No.1136, Palais des Champs-Elysées.
- 1900: Salon des artistes français, Solitude, Place de Breteuil, in Paris
- 1902: Salon de la Nationale des Beaux-Arts de Paris, No.698, Portrait de J. P. Laurens
- 1910 - Salon des artistes français, Didon
- 1911: Salon des artistes français, La Dame en Bleu
- 1912: Salon des artistes français, Suzanne
- 1913: Salon des artistes français, Jeune musicien et danseuse, and Les Soupirants
- 1914: Salon des artistes français, Divertissement dans un parc
- 1924: Exhibition in Canada, as part of a group including: Charles Hoffbauer, Emile Aubry, Henri Dabadie, André Devambez, Louis Jourdan, Georges Paul Leroux, Auguste Leroux et al.
- 1929: Salon des artistes français, Portrait de Jacques Copeau (1879-1949), homme de lettre et comédien, No.1342 in the catalogue

== Honours and awards ==
- 1899: Member of the Society of French Artists
- 1933: Member of the Institute (Academy of Fine Arts)

== Museums exhibiting his works ==
- Museum Petit Palais in Paris
- Musée du Luxembourg in Paris
- Museum of Brou in Bourg-en-Bresse
- Musée du Louvre, Department of Painting
- Musée d'Orsay in Paris
- Musée des Beaux-Arts de Dijon
- Museum of the Old Castle in Laval
- Capitole de Toulouse
