= Dominique Frassati =

French painter

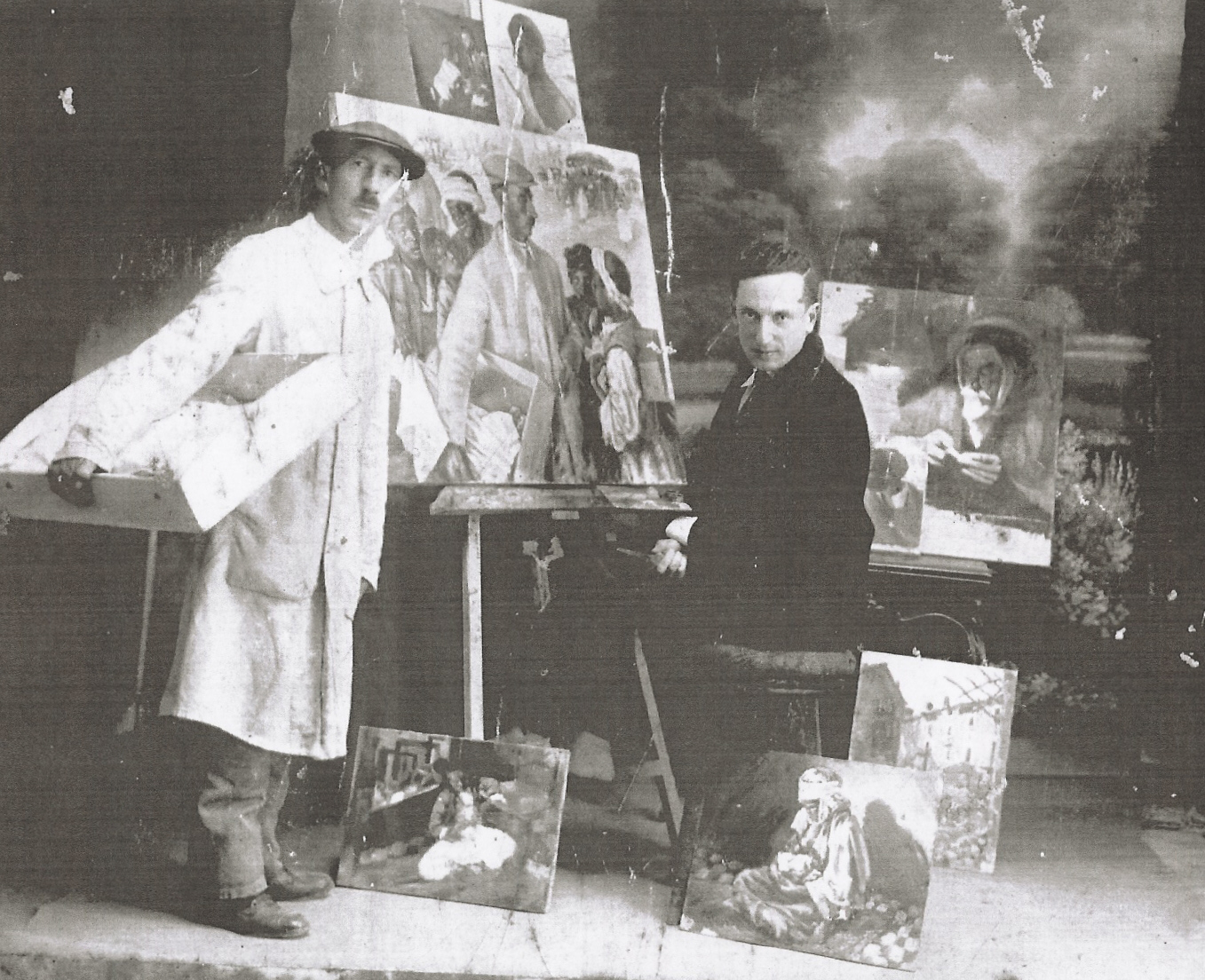
Frassati at his studio in Oran

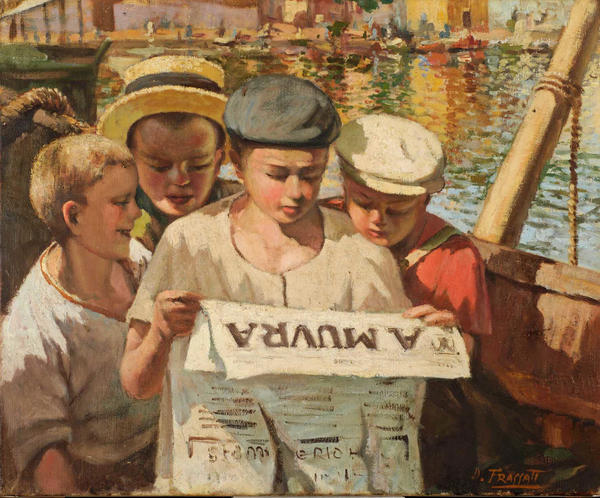
Four Young Fishermen in Ajaccio

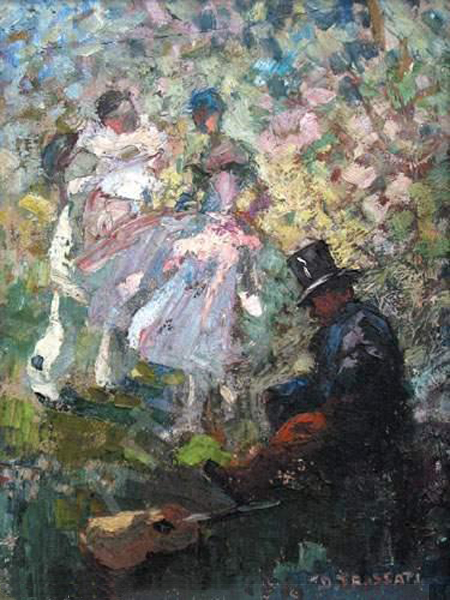
Musiciens au Parc

Dominique Frassati (29 March 1896, Corte – 10 July 1947, Corte) was a French-Corsican painter, known for genre scenes and landscapes. He was originally self-taught; taking his first formal lessons at the age of thirty-two.

== Biography ==
At the age of eighteen, when World War I began, he enlisted in the Army. While on the front lines, he was gassed, which damaged his lungs and made him nearly blind. After the war his uncle, Santos Manfredi, a wealthy landowner and philanthropist, brought him to Argentina, where he received treatment to restore his sight.

His uncle planned to entrust him with the management of a large agricultural estate, but he chose to return to France in 1920. He initially settled in Paris, then went back to Corte in 1923, where he created decorations for shop windows and designed posters for sporting events.

In 1923, he moved to North Africa. He would live in Oran for five years, painting portraits, landscapes and street scenes. In 1928, he once again went to Paris, where he enrolled at the Académie Julian. From 1929 to 1930, he worked in the studios of Paul Albert Laurens. While there, he married Élise Ansidei.

He returned to Corsica in 1934 and settled in Ajaccio. Two year later, he was appointed Deputy Curator at the Musée Fesch. When the Curator, François Corbellini (1863–1943), retired in 1937, Frassati took his place. The following year, he became general Curator of all the museums in Ajaccio.

A street in Ajaccio has been named after him. In addition to the Musée Fesch, his works may be seen at the Ahmed Zabana National Museum.

One of his pieces, Ajaccio, the docks, sold at auction for US$1,771 in 2020.
