= Shang Yang (artist) =

Chinese painter (born 1942)

Shang Yang (Chinese: 尚扬; born 1942, former name Shang Nengquan) is a contemporary Chinese painter based in Beijing and is considered one of the most important painters of the life-stream movement. Known for his oriental humanist thought he believes landscapes are living things and puts their spirit into his brushwork. In 1965 he graduated from the Hubei Art Academy, where he then taught for several years. He received his masters from the Hubei Art Academy in 1981. Yang became the Associate President in 1989. Shang Yang became a Professor and the Officer-in-Charge of Fine Arts at the Research Institute of South China Normal University in 1993. Also in 1993, he became the Vice President of the Chinese Art painting Society. Shang Yang has exhibited extensively in China since the 1980s, including at Shanghai Biennale in 1996, and has shown internationally at galleries in London, Paris, Tokyo, St. Petersburg, and Helsinki. Shang Yang's work often appropriates images from traditional Chinese landscape painting, which are screened onto the canvas by a machine; he then distorts the image with graffiti or obtrusive geometrical designs. His works combine avant-garde exploration and solid artistic skill to create unique works of expressionism oil painting.

== Career Timeline ==
1942 - Born at Honghu, Hubei Province. Kai County, Sichuan Province by Origin

1957 - Studied in Hubei Art Academy Attached Middle School

1965 - Graduated from Hubei Institute of Fine Arts, then Served as Art Editor in Hubei People's Publishing House

1981 - Graduated with M.A. in Oil Painting Department from Hubei Institute of Fine Arts

1985 - Trustee of Chinese Artists Association

1987 - Professor of Hubei Institute of Fine Arts

1989 - Vice President of Hubei Institute of Fine Arts

1995 - Director in Institute of Fine Arts of South China Normal University and Vice Chairman of Chinese Oil Painting Association.

1997 - Professor in Fine Arts Academy of Capital Normal University

2000 - Director in Fine Arts Academy of Capital Normal University

2009 - China Artists Association, Vice Director of the Oil Painting Arts

== Style ==
Shang Yang was trained Soviet Realism but after the Cultural Revolution he was one of the first artists to reject his training. He started creating mixed media works in the early 1980s.

Shang Yang's work tends to use images from traditional Chinese landscape paintings. The images are then screened onto a canvas by a machine. He then distorts the image with graffiti or obtrusive geometrical designs. Shang Yang has demonstrated an infatuation with the yellow earth plateau remote from southern culture. In the years 1984-1985, Shang Yang created a series of oil paintings on Korean paper about the conditions and customs of northern Shaanxi, clearly signaling his change in artistic style. In his painting 'Yellow River boatmen' you can see the beginnings of his fascination with the Loess Plateau, and this wells forth in an uninhibited way in his later works in the fundamental timbre of yellow. In Mother of the Loess Plateau the artist loves the barren mountainous area of the Yellow River Basin and its people. In this work, the image of the mother, the stone wall behind her, and the loess hills in the background link together, hinting at the inseparable bond created by life in a warm and intrepid environment.

=== Yellow Theme ===
"When Shang Yang was an art student he applied for a field trip to northern Shaanxi Province in 1981, many of his fellow students considered the artist to be “a little under the weather.” Though revered as the cradle of Chinese civilization, the Yellow River Basin was then one of the poorest areas in the country and few of his classmates could understand the artist's passion for the region. The trip, though, proved to be a life-changing experience for the artist, providing the inspiration for nearly three decades of work, which have earned him the reputation as the “evergreen tree” for his endless stream of artistic creativity and a place as one of the country's most accomplished artists. According to Shang, while in Shaanxi, he felt completely removed from the materialism of the world around him and was able to connect on a fundamental level with the region's natural surroundings. He was greatly inspired by Shaanxi’s landscapes and rural communities and created many oil paintings revolving around the theme of the Yellow River, which are still among the artist’s most famous works. Painted in a burst of yellow hues, His Shaanxi paintings often depicted the hard lives of the locals, such as the Yellow River’s taut and tanned boat trackers or women with weather-beaten faces, and all resonate with a deep sense of human compassion."

Shang Yang's use of warm yellow tones endows the landscape of rock and loess with poetry. While stillness and warmth replace the bare desolation, the gate of worn stones and the barren earth and slopes are imbued with a rich romantic air. In these works, what some critics described at the time as 'Shang Yang's yellow' came to be the central player. This side-lit loess with its duller brownish yellow was not at all coquettish in its appeal, exhibiting only a natural mood. Shang Yang's later works progressively began to break loose from the bewitchment or control exerted by the colors of the region, as his paintings gave fuller play and expression to subjective elements.

== Controversy/Conflict ==
In June 1989, Shang Yang lost his position as head of Hubei Institute of Fine Arts after he marched with some of his students in Tiananmen Square. 3 months before the march, Yang exhibited a series of paintings at Beijing's National Gallery called "State". These works appeared to express Yang's dissatisfaction with the current state of China and his own frazzled state of mind.

Shang Yang regained respect in 1992 with the release of his piece "Morning Tea" which is said to examine concerns for lost values in Chinese culture. One of his latest works, titled "Bride", reveals Yang's worries of commercialism in China. The piece is a Mono Lisa covered in labels of fast food to represent the connections between culture and the market.

== Growth ==
Shang Yang's paintings have been increasing in value. Hard Labor, an oil on canvas piece, was estimated to sell for up to $995,797 at a 2009 auction. Shang Yang participated in the Post-89 Chinese New Art exhibition. It was held in the massive Hong Kong Arts Center in January and February 1993. There were more than 200 paintings, sculptures and installations by more than 50 artists.

=== Dong Qichang Project ===
Since 2003, Shang Yang has continuosly worked on his Dong Qichang Project. The project, a summary of his Big Scenery Series, explores the idea that the aggressive intervention of contemporary culture has fragmented and flattened the solid traditional Chinese logic of self-sufficiency, harmony and unity. This exhibition marks Shang Yang's first solo show within more than five decades of art production.

== Solo exhibitions ==
2013 Shang Yang's Art in Suzhou, Suzhou Museum

2012 Diaries and Scripts, VA Center

    Academy of Art Design Tsinghua University, Beijing, China

2009 The Dong Qichang Project, Beijing Center for the Arts. Beijing, China.

2006 Essence of Sketch – Shang Yang's Painting Exhibition, Chengdu Blue Space Art Gallery, Sichuan, China.

== Invitational Exhibitions and Awards (Recent Years) ==
2015 Inframince: Aura of Nature, Tabula Rasa Gallery, Beijing

2011 “Across - Chinese Contemporary Art Exhibition II”, Museum of Monreale Palermo, Sicily, Italy

2010 “Across - Chinese Contemporary Art Exhibition I”, Spoletto Old City Art Gallery, Spoletto, Italy

2010

The State of Things — Contemporary Art from China and Belgium. National Art Museum of China

Reshaping History — China New Art from 2000 to 2009. China National Convention Center.

Thirty Years of Chinese Contemporary Art 1979—2009. Minsheng Art Museum, Shanghai, China

Unending Distance — the 3rd Exhibition of Abstract Art. PIFO New Art Gallery, Beijing, China

Research and Exceed — The Second Exhibition of Small Oil Paintings. National Art Museum of China

Ink 2010 Shanghai World Expo. Shanghai World Expo Bureau zero carbon Museum, China

The third abstract - Chinese Contemporary ink painting exhibition. Shanghai Duolun Museum of Art, China

2009

Ink not Ink: Chinese Contemporary Ink and Wash Art Exhibition. Drexel University Philadelphia Museum of Art, Philadelphia, USA

Ink not Ink: Chinese Contemporary Ink and Wash Art Exhibition. Warsaw Royal Castle, Hungarian Agricultural Museum, The National Museum of Contemporary Art of Romania, Sculpture Museum of the Croatian Academy of Science and Arts.

Yi School: Century Thinking, Today Art Museum

New Image: Contemporary Chinese Ink and Paper Art Exhibition. Belarus National Gallery, Minsk, Belarus; Serbia History.

Open sight - Chinese Contemporary Art Exhibition, The Czech National Gallery

In the - abstract art exhibition in occasion of the birth of a hundred years, Beijing partial front new art space

State of affairs -EUROPALIAChina Art Festival Exhibition, Belgian Royal Palace of Fine Arts

Ink and wash painting calligraphy - a third abstraction, Shanghai Contrasts Gallery

Traditional Easter - Chinese Contemporary Art Exhibition, Frankfurt, Germany BASIS SPACE

Collision - 27 cases of Chinese contemporary art, Beijing's Central Academy of Fine Arts Gallery

2009 Context spiritual elite Chinese version of the Contemporary Art Exhibition, Nanjing Qinghe Art Gallery, Beijing Art America Fund

Traditional Easter - Chinese Contemporary Art Exhibition Shandong Library

2009 China Art Exhibition, Beijing Central Iron Age Museum of Art

Hill also has water - 2009 China Contemporary Art Exhibition, Taipei Contemplation Arts Center, Taiwan

Art 60 years of New China, National Art Museum of China, Beijing, China

2008

Yi School: Thirty Years of Chinese “Abstraction”, La Caixa Forum Museum of Parma, Barcelona and Madrid, Spain

Inside·Outside Images – The Inviting Exhibition of Chinese Contemporary Oil Paintings, Yu Xin Art Museum, Singapore

Writings·Marks – Joint Exhibition of 20 Artists in Abstract Painting, Imperial City Art Museum, Beijing, China

2008 Chinese Contemporary Art Documenta, Wall Art Museum, Beijing, China

The Third Beijing International Art Biennale, China 2008, National Art Museum of China, Beijing, China

2D and 3D, Negotiating Visual Languages, PMK Gallery, Beijing, China

Hypallage –The Post Modern Mode of Chinese Contemporary Art, the OCT Art& Design Gallery, Shenzhen, China

Ink Not Ink: Chinese Modern Ink and Wash Art Exhibition, Shenzhen Art Museum, Shenzhen; Today Art Museum, Beijing, China

Expand & Fusion – Chinese Oil Painting Study and Exhibition, National Art Museum of China, Beijing, China

The Grit between the Stones – A Meeting between Swedish and Chinese Contemporary Painting, Museum of Far Eastern Antiquities, Stockholm, Sweden; National Art Museum of China, Beijing, China

Sunshine International Art Annual Exhibition, Sunshine International Art Museum, Beijing, China

People·History – Exhibition of Studies of Chinese Art of the 20th Century, CAFA Art Museum, Beijing, China

Culture after Culture – 12 Chinese Contemporary Oil Painters Exhibition, YUAN Center of Art, Beijing, China

Pursuing source and doctrine – Oil Painting Research Exhibition, National Art Museum of China, Beijing, China

Art Basel Miami Beach 2008, Miami, USA

2007

The Scenery of Desire – Shang Yang and His Student Art Exhibition, Bridge Gallery, Beijing; MOCA Shijiazhuang, Shijizhuang, Hebei Province, China

Открытое китаиское искусство, Русский музей, St.Petersburg, Russia

Rote Berge, Grunes wasser Chinesische und Beutsche Kunstler Heute, Lubecker Museum, Lubecker; Pfalz History Museum, Pfalz, Germany

Landscape – Nature·Spirit, Ateneum Art Museum, Helsinki, Finland

On Ink and Wash – A Dialogue between Contemporary Artists, Tank Loft·Chongqing Contemporary Art Center, Chongqing; Shenzhen Art Museum, Shenzhen, China

Trace Contemporary·Chinese Version, 2007 Credit Suisse Beijing Comprehensive art Exhibition, Today Art Museum, Beijing, China

Strategy on Paper – Works on Paper Invitational, Square Gallery of Contemporary Art, Jiangsu Province, China

Interception – Chinese Image in Contemporary Art Invitation Show, Three Gorges Museum, Chongqing, China

Decennial, Hejingyuan museum of art opening exhibition, H.J.Y. Contemporary Art Center, Beijing, China

2006

Anatomical Signs – Internationally Invitational Exhibition of Contemporary Art, Baoqu Tang Modern Art Gallery, Hong Kong, China

China Scenery, Square Gallery of Contemporary Art, Nanjing, Jiangsu Province, China

Expanding Realism – Chinese Mainland Oil Painting from 1978, Taipei Fine Art Museum, Taipei, China

The Second Exhibition of Chinese Art Today, National Art Museum of China, Beijing, China

Cross the Continent – Joint Exhibition of 11 Artists from China and Germany, Sanxian Art Space, Shanghai, China

Chinese Contemporary Art Document Exhibition, Honored with the Award of Literature, Beijing World Art Museum, The China Millennium Monument, Beijing, China

2005

Dress Up, Chinese Opera Art Exhibition, Today Art Museum, Beijing, China

Nature and Human – The Second Contemporary China Landscape Painting • Oil Landscape Painting Exhibition, National Art Museum of China, Beijing, China

Asian Art Exhibition, Shunde Art Gallery, Guangzhou, Guangdong Province, China

Up and Down The Great River: A Retrospection of New Era's Chinese Oil Painting, National Art Museum of China, Beijing, China

Conspire: The 1st Exhibition of T.S.1 Contemporary Art Center, TS1 Contemporary Art Center, Beijing, China

The Endless Landscape, Invitational Contemporary Oil Painting Exhibition Jiangsu Art Museum, Nanjing, Jiangsu Province, China

2004

Inviting Exhibition of Contemporary Art from China, France and Korea, International Art Gallery, Beijing, China

Baishi / Youji, Liu Hai Su Art Museum, Shanghai; Art Museum of Central Academy of Fine Arts, Beijing, China

The First Nominated Exhibition of Fine Art Literature, Honored with the Award of Literature, Art Gallery of Hubei Institute of Fine Arts, Wuhan, Hubei Province, China

2003

An Opening Era, Celebration Exhibition of 40th Anniversary of Founding of China National Museum of Fine Arts, National Art Museum of China, Beijing, China

Beijing International Art Biennial, National Art Museum of China, Beijing, China

Premieres Lueurs sur L' Orient—L'aventure de la peinture chinoise au 20ème Siecle, Palais de la Porte Dorée, Paris, France

Fine Pieces of New Expressionism Oil Painting of Chinese Master, Liu Hai Su Art Museum, Shanghai, China

The Fine Pieces Exhibition of The Third Oil Painting Exhibition of China, National Art Museum of China, Beijing, China

2002

Behind The Reality, Dimensions Art Center, Taipei, China

The First Guangzhou Triennial, Guangdong Museum of Art, Guangzhou, Guangdong Province, China

The First Triennial of Chinese Arts, Guangzhou Art Museum, Guangzhou, Guangdong Province, China

Century Demeanor—Exhibition of China's Contemporary Art Masters, Beijing World Art Museum, The China Millennium Monument, Beijing, China

Concept Image: 2002 China Modern Oil painting Invitation Exhibition, Shenzhen Art Museum, Shenzhen, China
