= Ge Yulu =

Chinese conceptual artist

Ge Yulu (Chinese: 葛宇路; pinyin: Gě Yǔlù, born November 28, 1990) is a Chinese conceptual artist and performance artist known for his interventions in public urban spaces. His work often explores themes of authorship, bureaucracy, surveillance and the dynamics between individual agency and institutional structures.

== Early life and education ==
Ge was born in Wuhan, Hubei Province, China. He earned a Bachelor of Fine Arts in Media Art from the Hubei Institute of Fine Arts (HIFA) in 2013. In 2018, he completed a Master of Fine Arts in Experimental Art at the Central Academy of Fine Arts (CAFA) in Beijing.

== Notable works ==
Ge's most famous project involved placing a street sign bearing his name (Chinese: 葛宇路; pinyin: Gě Yǔ Lù, Ge Yu Road) on an unnamed road in Baiziwan, Chaoyang District, Beijing, in 2013. For four years, nobody appeared to realise that the sign was not official, perhaps because the last character of his name, lu (路), means "road" in Chinese. Over four years, from 2013-2017, the name was adopted by residents and even appeared on digital maps (e.g., Baidu Maps, Amap (Gaode Maps), and Google Maps), exposing gaps in municipal oversight. Authorities replaced the sign in 2017 by "Baiziwannanyi Rd" (Chinese: 百子湾南一路; pinyin: Bǎizǐwān Nányī Lù) after media coverage, citing violations of naming regulations. The project raised questions about grassroots autonomy versus state control in urban planning.

"The East Lake Project" (2015) was a performance where Ge attempted to "partition" Wuhan's East Lake with a fictional border, commenting on territorial disputes.

"Eye Contact" (2016) was a performance artwork where Ge stared at surveillance cameras for hours for days on end until a security guard showed up to "stop him 'making eye contact' with him on the surveillance monitor." It took four weeks of staring at four different cameras for 2–3 hours a day for a security guard to notice and confront Ge. The performance has been described both as typical of Ge's "spontaneous one-man band manner" and as an creative inversion of the usual relationship between the surveilled person, who has no power, and the surveiller, who is usually invisible and inhuman, but who in this performance was exposed. The performance has also been discussed as an example of how art and pranks can circumvent censorship: a critique of surveillance in a written article might have caused problems, but being "silly and irresponsible" led only to a lecture.

"Security Check" (2013) enacts the disruption of a closed-network system through the solitary act of scaling a building and discovering a point of entry—transforming the body into both tool and gesture, a singular intervention against architectural enclosure.

== Recognition ==
In addition to media coverage in China and internationally, Ge Yulu and his work are the subject of multiple peer-reviewed articles in scholarly journals. He is also discussed in the 2024 book The Conformed Body: Contemporary Art in China.

== Exhibitions ==
Ge Yulu has participated in major exhibitions including the Aichi Triennale (2019) and the CAFAM Biennial (2016). He has presented solo shows at institutions such as Fei Art Museum in Guangzhou and Beijing Commune. His work has been featured in group exhibitions at notable venues including the Wuhan Art Museum, Power Station of Art in Shanghai, OCT Contemporary Art Terminals in both Shenzhen and Shanghai, MOCA Yinchuan, G Museum in Nanjing, TANK Shanghai, Minsheng Art Museum in Beijing, the 21st Century Museum of Contemporary Art in Kanazawa, the Art Museum of Sichuan Fine Arts Institute in Chongqing, and the CAFA Museum in Beijing. In 2019, he was shortlisted for both the Art 8 Youth Prize and the 13th AAC Art China Young Artist Award. His solo exhibition Ge Yulu received the "Best Exhibition Award – Innovation Prize" during Gallery Weekend Beijing 2020.
