= Tang Yihe =

Chinese painter (1905–1944)

- 唐一禾
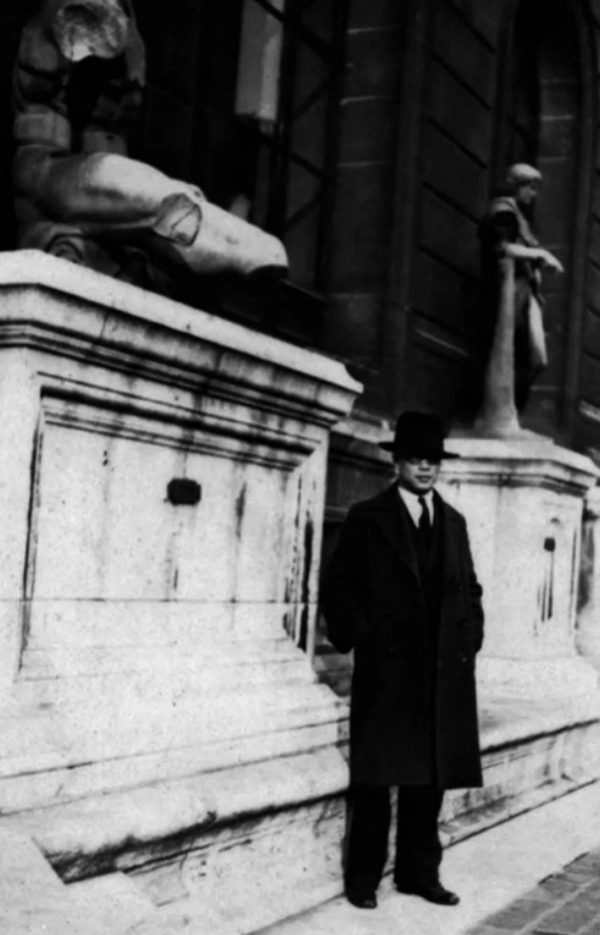
- Born: 1905; Wuhan City, Hubei Province, China
- Died: 24 March 1944 (aged 38–39); Jiangjin City, Sichuan Province, China
- Education: Wuchang College of Arts, École nationale supérieure des beaux-arts
- Alma mater: Hubei Institute of Fine Arts, Beaux-Arts de Paris
- Known for: The first generation of Chinese oil painters

Tang Yihe (唐一禾) (1905 – 24 March 1944) was a Chinese artist.

Tang Yihe was born in 1905 in Wuchang, Hubei Province of China. He studied at the Wuchang College of Arts in 1922, and then transferred to the Beijing Fine Arts College in 1924. In 1933, Tang Yihe, together with Chang Shuhong, Qin Xuanfu, Lv shibai, Zeng Zhushao, and Wang Linyi, initiated the establishment of the "Association of Artists Travelling to France", and graduated from the Beaux-Arts de Paris (Studied with Paul Albert Laurens) in the winter of 1934 and returned to China, where he served as the teaching director and head of the Western Painting Section of the Wuchang College of Arts, today the Hubei Institute of Fine Arts.

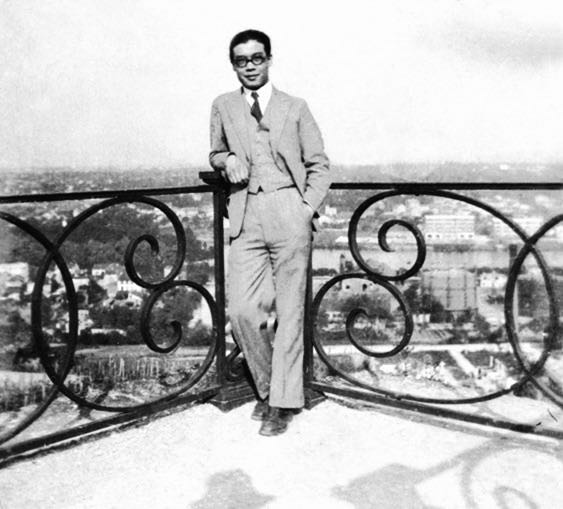
Yihe Tang in Paris

Under the influence of his older brother, Tang began learning painting at a young age. After the May Fourth Movement broke out in 1919, the 15-year-old became enthusiastic about learning new artistic knowledge. The movement's ideas on science and democracy led him to turn towards realistic painting.

During his stay at the Beaux-Arts de Paris, Tang, influenced by humanist ideas in Europe, wanted to alleviate the suffering of the Chinese population due to oppression by foreign powers. While new schools of thought were constantly emerging in Europe at that time, he embraced realism instead of choosing modernism like some artists, while remaining open to different artistic styles: among the precious paintings he brought back from France were many impressionist works. He was greatly inspired by a Picasso lecture that he attended.

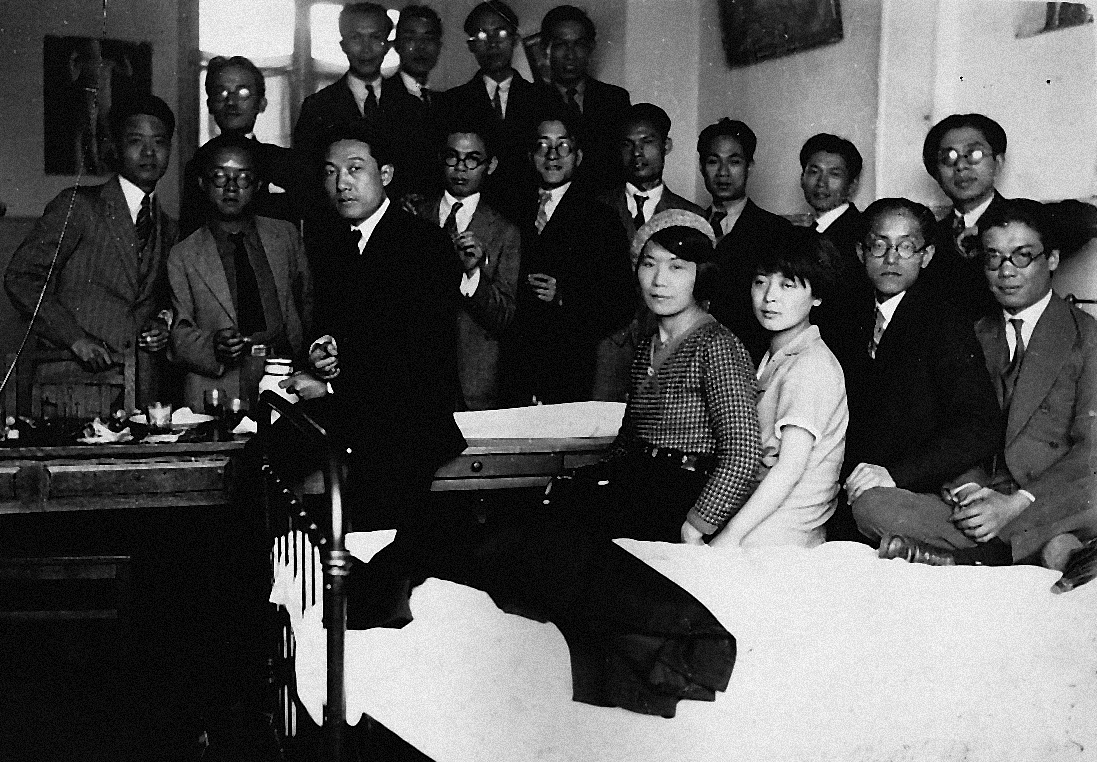
The group members photo of The Fine Arts Association of Chinese studying in France, welcoming Mr. Xu Beihong (First from the right, Mr. Yihe Tang)

In 1933, Chinese students, including Tang Yihe, Chang Shuhong, Qin Xuanfu, Lü Sibai, Zeng Zhushao, and Wang Linyi, together founded the Association of Chinese Artists in France. The following year, Mr. Tang graduated with honors and returned to China.

In 1938, during the Second Sino-Japanese War, the Wuchang College of Arts campus was destroyed in the Battle of Wuhan, and the college relocated westward to Sichuan Jiangjin. From 1940 to 1944, he was elected as the director and executive director of the All-China Fine Arts Association. On 24 March 1944, Tang Yihe and his elder brother Tang Yijing (headmaster of Wuchang College of Arts) went to Chongqing by boat to participate in the All-China Art Association. When their boat wrecked, Tang was able to escape, but he died after turning back to save his brother.
