= Liu Shouxiang =

Chinese watercolor painter (1958–2020)

Liu Shouxiang 刘寿祥
- Born: 5 April 1958; Wuhan, Hubei, China
- Died: 13 February 2020 (aged 61); Wuhan, Hubei, China
- Known for: Painting

Chinese name
- Chinese: 刘寿祥
- Traditional Chinese: 劉壽祥
Transcriptions
Standard Mandarin
- Hanyu Pinyin: Liú Shòuxiáng

Liu Shouxiang (Chinese: 刘寿祥, 5 April 1958 – 13 February 2020) was a Chinese watercolor painter and professor at the Hubei Institute of Fine Arts. His work won many awards and was collected by many art museums. He was also a member of the China Democratic League.

== Biography ==
Liu was born in Wuhan. In 1981, he graduated from the Hubei Institute of Fine Arts in the Department of Fine Arts, majored in teaching. He stayed in school and served as the director of the Department of Fine Arts Education. In 1987, he founded the Department of Watercolor Painting in the Hubei Institute of Technology Teachers' Department. In 2009, he established a watercolor painting department and served as the head of the department. He was the first person to set up a watercolor painting department in a Chinese art college. Liu's technique, in particular his ability to shade colors achieved the same depth and diversity in scale as seen in many oil paintings. According to Fan Feng, director of Wuhan Art Museum, Liu's paintings have a smart arrangement of space and shapes that makes them "full of motion and a sense of rhythm"; for him, Liu "paid great attention to nuances and expressed in his artworks that all things on Earth possess a sensibility and a beauty of their own". He retired in 2018. In the same year, Hubei University hired Liu as a distinguished professor.

On 17 January 2020, Liu went to Zhuhai for an exhibition, not knowing he had contracted coronavirus disease 2019. At 5 am on 13 February, Liu Shouxiang died of coronavirus in Wuhan Jinyintan Hospital at the age of 61. His daughter and son-in-law were also hospitalized with the virus.
