= Cao Dan =

Chinese painter

Cao Dan (Chinese: 曹丹) (born in 1960 in Wuhan, Hubei province) is a contemporary Chinese painter. Cao Dan graduated from Hubei Institute of Fine Arts, Wuhan, China in 1982, and is currently teaching as a professor there.

Currently, Cao Dan is working on a series called Butterfly Effect. This title refers to the short story A Sound of Thunder (1952) by Ray Bradbury, in which a small change, such as butterfly flapping its wings, causes a series of major changes. Cao Dan projects this idea on contemporary changes in world economics and the sudden resistance to the label made in China and all its possible connotations. Additionally, in traditional Chinese culture the butterfly is seen as an analogy of female consciousness. This series represents women penetrating in men's product area. These works are executed in an instantly recognisable style, using bright primary colors.

== Selected solo exhibitions ==
- 2008
  - “Butterfly File”, Hubei Institute of Fine Arts, Wuhan, China
  - “Hubei!”, Edward Pranger Oriental Art Gallery, Amsterdam, the Netherlands

== Selected group exhibitions ==
- 2008
  - “Wuhan 2008 Contemporary Art Invitational Exhibition”, Hubei Institute of Fine Arts, Wuhan, China
- 2007
  - “Forms of Concepts: The Reform of Concepts of Chinese Contemporary Art 1987-2007－The New Generation and Bad Art”, 2007 Wuhan 2nd Documentary Exhibition of Fine Arts, Wuhan, China
  - “The 8th China Art Festival. Fifty Anniversaries of Art Exhibition of Hubei Artists Association”, Wuhan, China
  - The 3rd Academic Art Exhibition, Hubei Institute of Fine Arts, Wuhan, China
- 1995
  - “Twenty Anniversaries”, International Art Exhibition, Nanjing, China
- 1994
  - The 8th Hubei Art Exhibition, Wuhan, China
- 1993
  - ‘93 Chinese Oil Painting Biennale Exhibition, China Art Gallery, Beijing, China
- 1991
  - Oil Painting Exhibition, Wuhan, China
- 1989
  - “China/Avant-garde Art Exhibition”, National Art Museum of China, Beijing
  - Contemporary Art Exhibition of Five Chinese Artists in USA
- 1988
  - Hubei Oil Painting Exhibition, Wuhan, China
- 1987
  - Hubei Youth Art Festival Exhibition, Beijing, China
- 1986
  - “Tribe. Tribe First Round Exhibition”, Wuhan, China
- 1985
  - The 6th China National Art Exhibition, Beijing, China
