= Qiu Ti =

Chinese modernist oil painter (1906–1958)

- 丘堤
- Born: Qiu Bizhen; 1906
- Died: 1958 (aged 51–52)
- Other names: Qiu Di; Schudy
- Siglum: XX
- Education: Shanghai Art Academy; Tokyo Pacific Ocean Art School
- Occupation: Artist
- Organization: Storm Society
- Notable work: Flower
- Style: Modernist oil painting
- Movement: Post-Impressionist
- Spouses: Unknown man; Pang Xunqin
- Children: Pang Tao

Qiu Ti (Chinese: 丘堤; 1906–1958), born Qiu Bizhen (Chinese: 丘碧珍) was a female Chinese modernist oil painter. She was the only female member of the Storm Society, an avant-garde art organization which advocated for participation in the modernist art movement in 1930s China.

== Personal life and education ==
Qiu Ti was born in 1906 in the small town Xiapu in the Fujian of China. She first enrolled in Xiapu County No. 1 Primary School in 1911, then in 1915 transferred to Xiapu County Girls' Middle School. In 1920, Qiu Ti entered Fuzhou Women's Normal School and dedicated herself to oil painting. She graduated from the Women's Normal School in 1925. After graduating, Qiu Ti married an unknown man with the surname Lin and together went to Beijing where Qiu Ti studied at the Beiping Art Academy while her husband studied economics at a different institution. Not long after moving to Beijing, Qiu Ti fell ill and returned to the south where she moved to Shanghai and enrolled in the Western Art Department at the Shanghai Art Academy. Qiu Ti graduated from the Academy in 1928 and traveled to Japan to attend the Tokyo East Asia Japanese Language Professional School and Tokyo Pacific Ocean Art School.

At the end of 1929, she returned to Shanghai and became a researcher in the oil painting department at the Shanghai Art Academy. Not long after, Qiu Ti and her husband divorced. In the fall of 1932, Qiu Ti attended a solo exhibition of Pang Xunqin and met him. They soon after had a love affair. By the following year she had experienced a failed pregnancy and became a member of the Storm Society, founded by Pang Xunqin prior to meeting Qiu Ti.

She died in 1958.

== Career ==
In 1930, Qiu Ti returned to China after studying abroad in Japan and began blending post-impressionist art techniques with the delicate art styles from China to create her own art style. Qiu Ti's style was more modern, challenged conservative concepts, and free-spirited. By 1934, three major Shanghai magazines had published pictures of Qiu Ti.

Qiu Ti's artwork that are still extant are oil paintings of landscapes or still life. Taking from post-impressionist techniques, her brushstrokes, which are short and round, are painted diagonally. The middle ground in her artworks had a composition that was commonly used in traditional Chinese landscape paintings. Qiu Ti's painting style was characterized by the mixture of Western brushstroke techniques and Chinese landscape composition.

=== Involvement in the Storm Society ===
Qiu Ti had joined the Storm Society by the time of their second exhibition on 10 October 1933. There, she exhibited her work Flower, which had won an award at that exhibition. The award the painting received is cited as being the reason for Qiu Ti's acceptance into the group as the sole female member, despite the male members apparently not needing any sort of group approval to be considered a member. The painting had seemed to generate some amount of discussion, as fellow Storm Society member Ni Yide wrote a statement of defense of the work of art. Qiu Ti also participated in the third Storm Society Exhibition in October 1934. There she exhibited her work titled Still Life.

== Today ==
Qiu Ti's artwork has been successfully auctioned. The prices of her artwork range from $27,582 to $877,682 depending on the medium used and the size of the artwork. In 2002, one of her artworks named Wild Chrysanthemums was sold in Beijing, China in an auction, which had a bid of $877,682.

== Exhibitions ==
- World Society Hall, China, 1933. Storm Society exhibition.
- China, 1934. Storm Society exhibition
- Art Beatus Vancouver, Canada, 1998. Three Generations of Chinese Modernism.
- Nanjing, China, 2006. Schudy.
