= Pang Xunqin =

Chinese painter

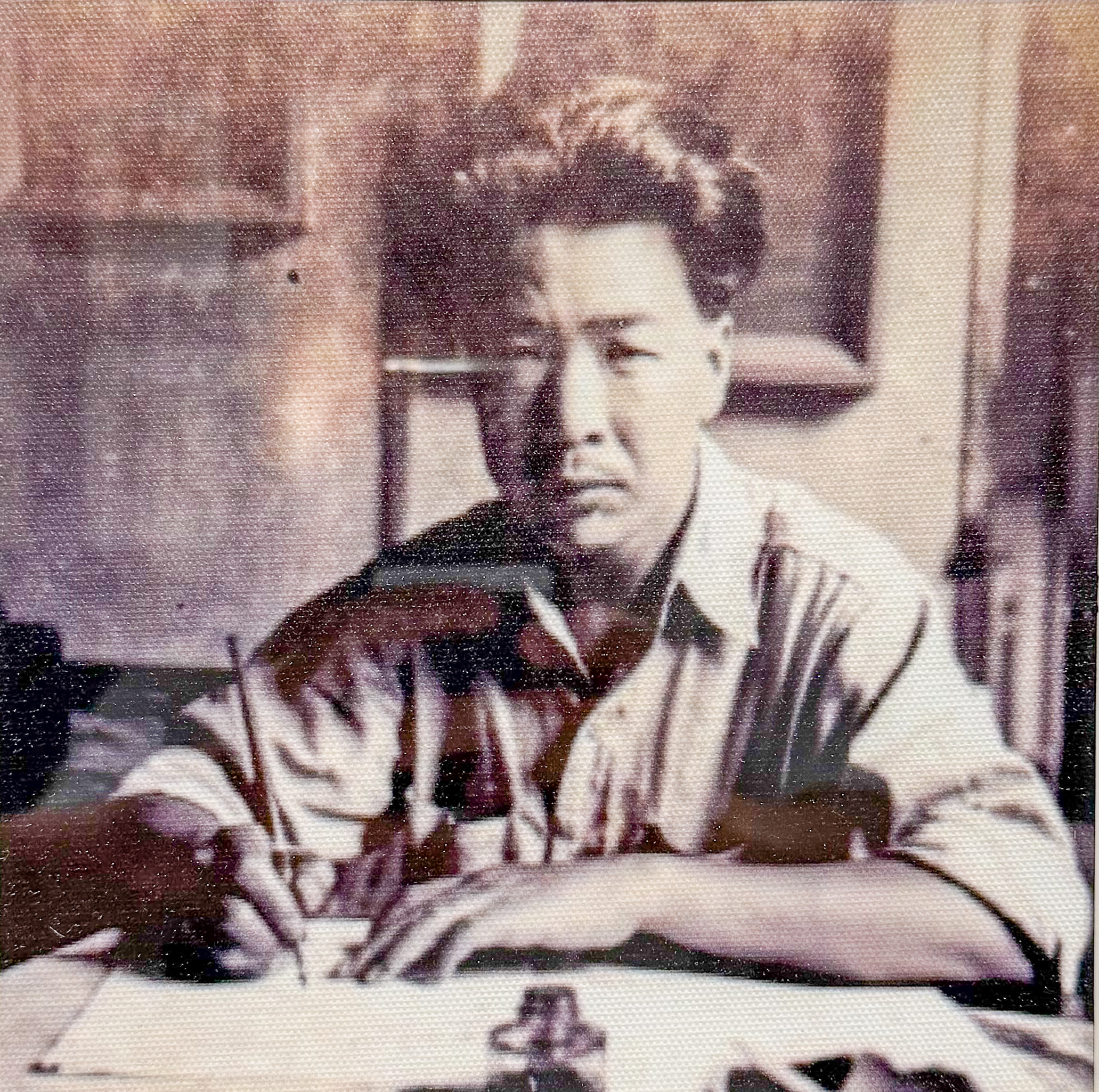
Pang in Guangzhou c. 1947.

Pang Xunqin (Chinese: 庞薰琹; June 20, 1906 – March 18, 1985) was a Chinese painter and teacher who, after studying in Paris, moved back to China and gave "traditional decoration art a modern context." Pang was also a co-founding member of the Storm Society, which aimed to bring a Parisian-style art world to China. He was greatly inspired by the French Art Nouveau movement. Throughout his lifetime, he explored different art styles, promoted modern art, and studied traditional Chinese culture. His involvement in the Storm Society, research on Miao culture, and contributions art education reflect his influence on Chinese art.

== Early life ==
Pang was born in Jiangsu to a landlord family. Demonstrating an inclination towards color and design at a young age, he started learning about the traditional Chinese painting of flowers at eleven. He studied medicine in Shanghai from 1921 to 1924 after being told by a foreign priest that the Chinese could never become great artists. In September 1925, Pang moved to Paris to study oil painting at the Académie Julian at the age of 19, following fellow patriots such as Xu Beihong. At the time, Paris was at the epicenter of newfound artistic trends, from Cubism to Fauvism, and was flocked to by foreign artists.

Pang spent over a year at the Académie Julian learning technical skills through live sketching, and receiving critiques from teachers at the prestigious École Nationale des Beaux-Arts. Influenced heavily by fellow artist Chang Yu, Pang followed Chang's advice not to enter the École Nationale des Beaux-Arts after his time at the Académie Julian. He began using Chinese ink brushes to sketch after observing Chang using the same technique. This technique supported Pang's desire to meld European modernism with traditional Chinese sketch conceptualism, in spite of many of his contemporaries resurrecting the Chinese tradition as an alternative to modernism. Most of Pang's work at the time was portraiture, self or otherwise.

== Return to China ==
Pang returned to China in 1930 to a divided nation that valued European academic realism over modernism. He returned to his hometown to study book on Chinese art history and theory, finding it difficult to return to a country which he had spent the past five years in no contact with. Pang held numerous solo exhibitions and, with Chang Ta-chien, founded the Tai-mong Association and later the Storm Society.

Pang wedded female artist Qiu Ti in 1932. During wars in the 1930s to early 1940s, Pang was forced to move frequently, all the while teaching and painting. In 1936, after the disbandment of the Storm Society, he taught at the Beiping Art Academy. He founded the Central College of Arts and Crafts in 1953, China's first arts and crafts institute. However, as a result of the Cultural Revolution, Pang was banned from teaching during China's Anti-Rightist Campaign, being forced into retirement in 1972. He spent the next two decades painting brightly colored still lifes and writing Studies on Chinese Decorative Paintings of the Previous Dynasties, which would be published in 1982. Pang was reinstated as a teacher in 1979 and his later academic research focused on Chinese traditional crafts and decoration. He had been impressed deeply by women in the rural mountains' ability to create beautiful patterns and motifs from only their imaginations.

In 1984, he completed his memoir, which was published by San-Lian Press that year. He died in Beijing in 1985 from complications of gastric cancer. The Pang Xunqin Memorial Arts Museum was founded in 1991 in his hometown, where almost five hundred paintings are exhibited.

== Storm Society ==
In 1931, Pang co-founded the avant-garde Storm Society (Chinese: 決瀾社 Juelan She "a great wave") with Ni Yide; an artist, critic, and writer. Three other artists, including Lin Fengmian, joined the Post-Impressionistic and Expressionist group. Between 1931 and 1935 the Storm Society held four exhibitions. The Storm Society's Manifesto claimed they were suffering under the stationary ways of the old society and had to escape. In October 1932 they printed this Manifesto, imploring "Let us rise up! With our raging passion and iron intellect, we will create a world interwoven with color, line, and form!" Pang himself said in retrospect there were several reasons for the advent of the group, "firstly, the members were all discontented with reality... secondly, everyone wanted to create a new road in art, and no one had the strength to do this individually... and thirdly, none of these people wanted to be dependent on powerful people." The first Storm Society exhibition was held on October 10, 1932, at the China Society for Study of the Arts in Shanghai. This exhibition showcased a total of 50 art pieces, including various works created by Pang Xunqin, such as Nude Landscape, A Piece of Tragedy, Wicker Chair, Such Is Paris, Comfort, and Café Shop. The goal of this exhibition was to motivate artistic activity and promote modernist art styles. Different kinds of art styles were showcased, including Neoclassicism, Fauvism, Eastern aesthetic influences, and Surrealism.

The Storm Society disbanded due to the Chinese Civil War, when realistic propaganda art became the only acceptable media.

== Founding Central Academy of Arts and Crafts ==
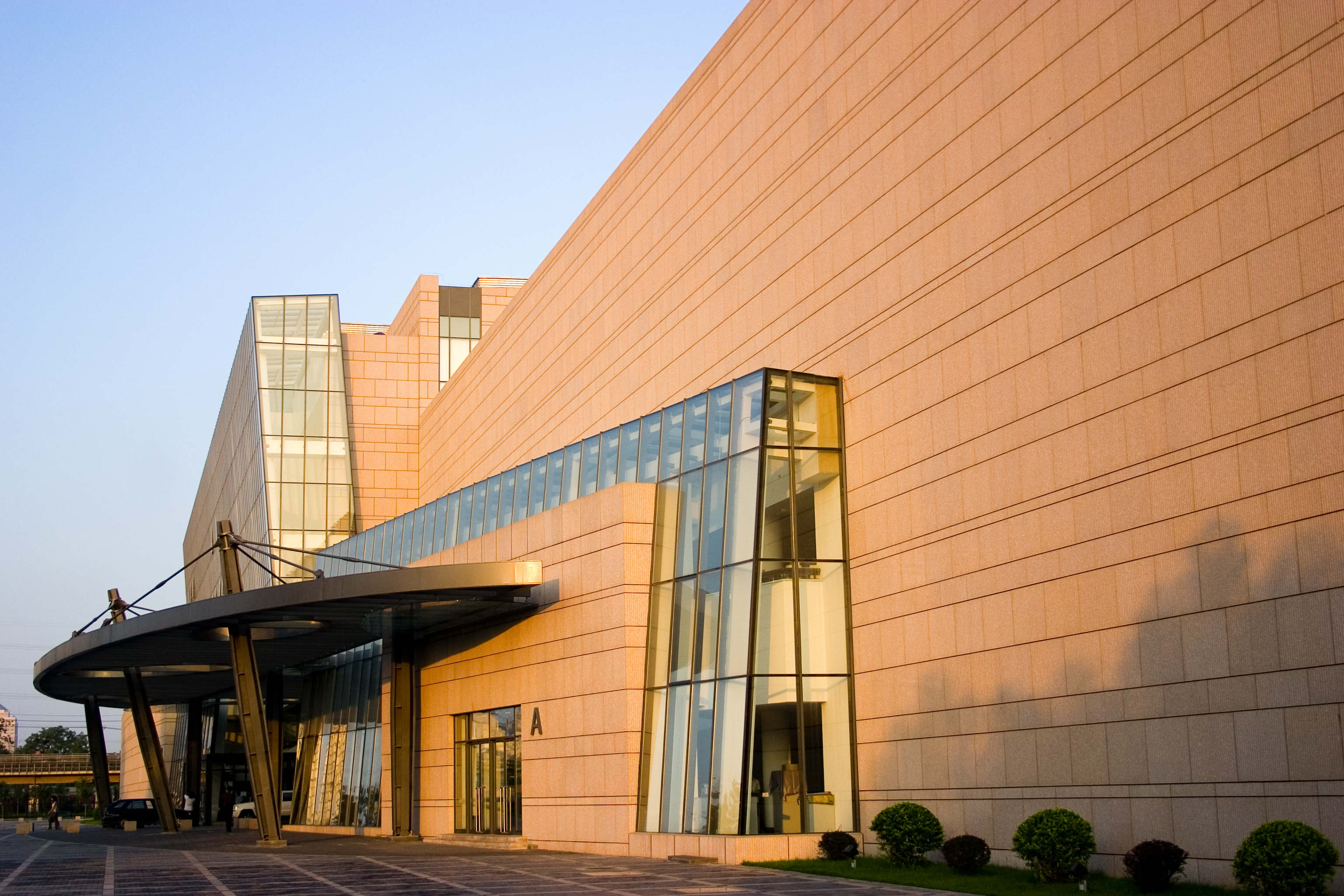
The Academy of Arts and Design at Tsinghua University, formerly known as the Central Academy of Arts and Crafts.

After returning to China from France, Pang initially tried to establish an educational design institution and finally submitted a formal proposal to the Ministry of Education. The proposal was approved and the academy was formed by 1953 by combining the arts and crafts department of the Central Academy of Fine Arts and the Zhejiang Academy of Fine Arts. Pang Xunqin became the academy's first vice president. The Central Academy of Arts and Crafts focused on preserving traditional Chinese crafts and techniques, including ceramics, woodcarving, and Jingtailan (Chinese cloisonné enamelwork). The academy helps intangible cultural heritage pass on to future generation to learn, explore and remember. Afterwards, the academy became a part of Tsinghua University and was renamed the Academy of Arts and Design.

== Pang Xunqin's Research on Miao Culture ==
In the 1940s, Pang Xunqin created several paintings showing the Miao people living in Guizhou Province, China. His paintings focused on their traditional clothing, decorative patterns, and daily lives. One of his paintings, Mother and Daughter, shows two Miao women wearing traditional clothes decorated with beautiful floral patterns. Pang used Chinese ink to create his paintings and meticulously depicted details of the clothing and fabric. He combined traditional Chinese painting methods with aspects influenced from Western art. Through these paintings, Pang wanted to show the beauty of Miao culture and express his own artistic ideas. His artwork provided opportunities for viewers to learn about the minority ethnic Miao culture.

== Philosophy ==
Pang painted with a lyrical sensitivity. He believed in the freedom of an artist and the necessity of changing one's painting as one gained new experience and knowledge. He often quoted Picasso as his favorite artist because of his impulsivity in rejecting his own previous styles in favor of the search for new ways of expression. He valued technical skill, but acknowledged the decreased need for it as photographs became more popular. Above all, young Pang praised self-expression. Later in life, facing wars, Pang would come to call his stress on individuality "superficial," remarking instead on the power of art against oppression.

=== Relationship between Art and Politics ===
The Storm Society participated in debates regarding the relationship between art and politics in China.The group focused on both the appearance of artwork and the ideas behind it. Its members believed that art should allow artists to express their own thoughts and feelings rather than only focus on political or social topics. A manifesto was published by the Storm Society in October 1932, which expressed changes that should be applied to the contemporary artistic world. The manifesto reflected the group's goal to promote individual expression and artistic innovation.
