= Ho Huai-shuo =

Taiwanese artist (born 1941)

Ho Huai-shuo (何懷碩, born November 3, 1941) is a Taiwanese ink painter, art and cultural critic, and writer.

== Life ==
=== Early life ===
Ho was born on November 3, 1941, in Chao'an, Guangdong Province, China. His father worked on a farm in the New Territories of Hong Kong, and he grew up in a family with humble means.

=== Chinese period (1956-1963) ===
From a young age, Ho had a strong interest in literature and art and enjoyed reading extensively. After completing primary and secondary education in Guangdong, he enrolled in the Affiliated High School of Hubei Academy of Fine Arts in 1956, where he mainly studied Western painting techniques and was influenced in ink painting by Fu Baoshi (1904-1965), Li Keran (1907-1989), Lin Fengmian (1900-1991), among others. It was not until he entered university that he decided to dedicate his life to ink painting. Due to the upheavals of the Cultural Revolution, Ho's studies at the Hubei Academy of Fine Arts were cut short after his first year of university in 1961, and he went to Hong Kong to join his relatives.

=== Education and early career in the US（1965-1974） ===
In 1962, Ho went to Taiwan to study in a preparatory program at Overseas Chinese University. In 1963, he transferred to the third year of the Department of Fine Arts at National Taiwan Normal University (NTNU) as a transfer student. At NTNU, he studied under teachers such as Huang Chun-bi (1898-1991) and Lin Yu-shan (1907-2004). However, due to the influence of important figures in the development of modern ink painting in China, such as Fu Baoshi and Lin Fengmian, as well as his knowledge system acquired during his time in China, Ho found Taiwan's ink painting development to be conservative and traditional compared to self-taught practices. His ideas also differed significantly from his teachers and classmates.

At the time, disappointed with the state of Taiwan's ink painting scene and feeling distressed in life, Ho turned to writing as a means of expressing his thoughts and feelings. He began publishing critiques and opinions in both on-campus and off-campus publications, and also applied his ideas of criticism and reflection on traditional painting to his creative process. Ho graduated from NTNU's Department of Fine Arts in 1965, winning the Ministry of Education's top prize for Chinese painting at his graduation exhibition. In 1969, he held his first formal solo exhibition at the Taipei American Cultural and Economic Center and introduced "the beauty of bitterness" as his personal creative theme and aesthetic. He also published a book titled "The Beauty of Bitterness (苦澀的美感)" in 1974, and after holding a solo exhibition at the National Museum of History the same year, he went to the US to pursue a master's degree.

=== Time in the United States (1974-1978) ===
In 1965, during his graduation exhibition, Ho Huai-shuo met Bob Littell, who was then the cultural attaché at the U.S. Embassy in Taiwan, and the two became friends. Littell invited him to hold an informal exhibition at the embassy on Yangmingshan, which opened up opportunities for Ho and eventually became the catalyst for his move to the United States for four years between 1974 and 1978. Ho pursued a master's degree in fine arts at St. John's University in New York in 1974 and spent the next four years traveling throughout the United States, exhibiting his work at universities, museums, and galleries across North America and visiting Europe and America. In 1977, Ho received his master's degree, and in 1978, he returned to Taiwan.

=== Return to Taiwan (1978-Present) ===
After returning to Taiwan in 1978, Ho held his first solo exhibition at the National Museum of History and received the Chinese Literary and Artistic Achievement Medal that same year. In 1979, he was hired as a professor in the Department of Fine Arts at National Taiwan Normal University and held another solo exhibition at the Apollo Gallery. Since then, Ho has been invited to exhibit his work in solo and group exhibitions in China, Hong Kong, Europe, and America. In 1982, he was appointed as an associate professor in the Department of Fine Arts at the National Institute of the Arts (now known as the National Taipei University of the Arts). While teaching, he continued to write and create, and in 1984 and 1990, he held solo exhibitions at the National Museum of History and the Taipei Fine Arts Museum, respectively. In 1997, he received the Coutts Contemporary Art Awards-Asia from the Coutts Contemporary Art Foundation in the United Kingdom. In 1999, he held another solo exhibition at the National Museum of History entitled "The Scene of Mind: Ho Huai-shuo Reviewing 1999." In 2019, he held a solo exhibition entitled "Creating Landscapes with Emotions: Ho Huai-shuo's Artworks Exhibition" at the Beijing Academy of Painting.
