= Raoul Serres =

French illustrator and printmaker

Raoul Jean Gustave Serres (1881–1971) was a French illustrator and printmaker. He won first prize in the Prix de Rome engraving category in 1906.
