= Huang Ko-Chuan =

Huang Ko-Chuan (Chinese:黃歌川, 1919–2010), originally named Chang Geng (昌耿) and known by the alias San Shan (三山), was an artist in Taiwan after the Second World War.

== Life ==
=== Chinese Period (1919–1948) ===
Huang Ko-Chuan was born on August 14, 1919, in Fuzhou, Fujian Province. Encouraged by his parents from a young age, he practiced calligraphy and painting using copybooks and drawing albums. After the outbreak of the Second Sino-Japanese War in 1937, Huang Ko-Chuan joined the "Anti-Enemy Theater (抗敵劇團)" in 1938, serving as a graphic designer and actor. While touring with the troupe, he began creating art, including comics, posters, woodcut prints, and edited related books and publications. In 1939, he published his first collection of personal works, titled "Huang Ko-Chuan's Collection of Decorative Woodcuts (黃歌川小品裝飾木刻集)." In 1941, he enrolled in Fujian Provincial Normal College (now Fujian Normal University) to study art, focusing on techniques such as sketching, oil painting, watercolor, and woodcut prints, laying the foundation for his artistic career. He graduated in 1943.

=== Taiwan Period (1949–2010) ===
After the Nationalist government moved south to Guangzhou, Huang Ko-Chuan went to Hong Kong to purchase multiple color cameras for self-study. In May 1949, he settled in Taiwan as a photographer for the Taiwan Shin Sheng Daily (臺灣新生報) and the Economic Daily (經濟日報), simultaneously creating illustrations and comics for the newspapers. Subsequently, he published culturally promotional and news-oriented photographic works in various newspapers and magazines such as "China Newsweek (中國一周)", "The Young Companion (良友)", "Cosmorama (中外畫報)", and "World Today (今日世界)". In 1962, he held the "Modern Color Portrait Exhibition (現代彩色人像展)" at Rose Marie Gallery (美而廉畫廊), showcasing the results of his self-study in overlapping and color-changing photography.

After stabilizing his life in Taiwan, Huang Ko-Chuan returned to painting, engaging in sketching, watercolor, and Chinese ink creations, which were published in newspapers and magazines at that time. In his works, one could see his attempts to integrate Eastern and Western painting media and styles. In 1959, he published "Huang Ko-Chuan's Painting Collection", featuring his Chinese ink works. Additionally, in the 1960s, Huang Ko-Chuan began simplifying the batik technique, actively promoting batik painting. In the process of improvement, he explored a new batik technique called "ice crack patterns (冰裂紋)", widely applied in his personal batik paintings.

In the late 1980s, he explored the theme of Chinese and Japanese Zen painting, starting in 1988 to create a series of Zen paintings based on the Zen master Bodhidharma. In 2006, he returned to oil painting, using the format of Western oil painting to depict traditional ink painting themes such as landscapes, flowers and birds, and Bodhidharma Zen paintings. He advocated for the "ink painting oil colorization" technique, using canvas instead of paper and oil colors instead of ink, blending Eastern ink style with Western oil painting techniques, aiming to accelerate the integration of ink painting with the international art scene.

In addition to his artistic and teaching pursuits, Huang Ko-Chuan participated in group exhibitions and international cultural exchanges. In 1958, he co-founded the "United Watercolor Painting Association (聯合水彩畫會)" with Liu Max, Wang Lan, and Xidejin. In 1962, he co-founded the "Chinese Painting Society" (now the Chinese Painting Society of the Republic of China, 中華民國畫學會) with Huang Chun-pi, Fu Juanfu, Zhu Dequn, and others. From 1982 to 1991, he served as the chairman of the Batik Painting Committee. In 1971, Huang Ko-Chuan established Contemporary Art Gallery (新藝畫廊), where he exhibited and sold his works, representing other artists' works, and established the "Chinese Batik Painting Research Center" to teach batik techniques. The gallery ceased operations in 1987.

Huang Ko-Chuan died June 4, 2010.

== Artistic creation ==
Huang Ko-Chuan's artistic creations were diverse, spanning various media, including batik painting, ink painting, oil painting, mixed media, watercolor painting, comics, photography, and woodcut prints. His works were selected for participation in the São Paulo Art Biennial, Spain Modern Art Exhibition, China Modern Art Exhibition, and the National Art Exhibition (Review Waiver).
