= Read Lee =

Chinese-born painter and art educator

- 李德
- Born: 7 October 1921; Jiangsu, China
- Died: 7 November 2010 (aged 89)
- Occupations: oil painter, art educator
- Style: Oil painting

Read Lee (李德, October 7, 1921 – November 7, 2010) was a Chinese-born painter and art educator who resided in Taiwan. He was born in Jiangsu Province, China, and his original name was Li Li-de (李立德). In 1948, he moved to Taiwan during the post-World War II period and became known as a prominent oil painter and art educator.

== Life ==
Read Lee, also known as Li Li-de, was born on October 7, 1921, in Changshu County, Jiangsu Province, China. Li was passionate about music and art from a young age and graduated from the Commerce Department of Chongqing University in 1945. In 1948, Li traveled by boat to Taiwan to assist in developing the Taiwan branch of the Taichung Agar Company. In September 1954, Li began studying watercolor and sketching with Professor Ma Pai-shui in the Department of Fine Arts at the Taiwan Provincial Normal College (now National Taiwan Normal University), and began sketching and studying Western art history to further his knowledge of oil painting.

In May 1956, Lee saw Chen Te-wang's painting "Three Flowers" at the 5th Taiwan Provincial Teacher Art Exhibition held at the Provincial Museum (now the National Taiwan Museum). He was deeply impressed and began studying under Chen for eight years (1956-1964). Read Lee never formally attended an art school, perhaps influenced by his teacher Chen Te-wang, who had adopted a self-learning approach through attending exhibitions, lectures, and famous art studios in Japan. In 1962, Lee added a wooden structure to his residence, a single-story house, which he named "Yi Lu (一廬)." That same year, he taught at the Fuxing School of Arts and Crafts (1962-1964) and taught drawing and painting at the National Museum of History (1962-1989). Lee's painting "Rhododendron" won a special award at the provincial exhibition in 1963, and he began accepting students at "Yi Lu" for painting, exhibitions, and teaching.

In 1966, Li and his "Yi Lu" students established the "Chun-Yi Painting Association (純一畫會)" and held five "Chun-Yi Painting Exhibitions (純一畫展)." In 1960, Li co-founded the "Ji Xiang Painting Association (集象畫會)" with Pang Tseng-Ying (龐曾瀛), Chang Dao-Lin (張道林), Liu Yu (劉煜), and others, and held the first "Ji Xiang Painting Exhibition (集象畫展)" in 1961, followed by three more in 1962, 1963, and 1966.

Lee taught at Fuxing School of Arts and Crafts, Taiwan Art Specialization School (now National Taiwan University of Arts), Chinese Culture University, Chung Yuan Christian University, and the Political Warfare School (now the Political Warfare Academy of the National Defense University), and served as a judge for various provincial and national art competitions. In 1971, Lee and Liu Qi-Wei and other fellow artists founded the "Chinese Art Academy (中國藝術學苑)" to provide a place for citizens to learn painting. In 1973, Lee received the "Golden Medal Award for Oil Painting" from the Republic of China Fine Arts Association (中華民國畫學會) and published two books, "Read Lee Paintings" and "Read Lee Sketches."

Lee died in 2010 at the age of 90. One year before his death, he traveled to Sainte-Victoire mountain, the site where Cézanne painted, accompanied by his students to create art. In 2011, Taipei Fine Arts Museum held the exhibition "The Struggle between Space and Sentiment: Read Lee" as a comprehensive retrospective of Lee's life for the first time in Taiwan.
