= Huang Kuang-nan =

- 黃光男

Minister without Portfolio, Executive Yuan
- In office 6 February 2012 – 3 February 2014
- Succeeded by: Chien Tai-lang

Personal details
- Education: National Kaohsiung Normal University (BFA); National Taiwan Normal University (MFA, PhD)

Huang Kuang-nan (Chinese: 黃光男; pinyin: Huáng Guāngnán, born February 15, 1944), also known by his pen name Shi-Po, is a Taiwanese ink wash painter, scholar, art educator, and cultural administrator. He was a Minister without Portfolio in the Executive Yuan from 2012 to 2014.

== Early life and education ==
Huang Kuang-nan was born on February 15, 1944, in Niaosong Township, Kaohsiung County, Taiwan (now part of Kaohsiung City). He grew up in a farming family and attended Kaohsiung County Little Harbor Junior High School (now Kaohsiung Municipal Xiaogang Junior High School). In his third year of junior high school (1960), he was inspired by the substitute art teacher, Jiang Ching-rong (1922-2015), to begin learning ink-wash painting.

Huang was admitted to the regular program at the Provincial Pingtung Normal School (now National Pingtung University of Education) in 1960 and was taught by Pai Hsueh-hen (1919-1971). After graduating from the normal school in 1963, Huang was assigned to Dingjin Elementary School in Kaohsiung City to teach. Three years later, in 1966, he passed the entrance exam to the Department of Fine Arts at the National Taiwan Academy of Arts (now National Taiwan University of Arts), where he studied under Li Meishu, Fu Chuan-fu, Jin Chin-bo, Shi Tsui-feng, Lin Shu-yao, and other artists. During this time, his understanding of painting theory, techniques, and creative concepts expanded and improved.

== Career ==
Huang graduated from the National Taiwan Academy of Arts in 1969 and began teaching at Shoushan Junior High School in Kaohsiung City the following year. In 1972, he transferred to the Pingtung Teacher's College, where he taught until 1985, when he embarked on a career in cultural administration. Huang also studied at the Department of Chinese Language and Literature at Kaohsiung Normal College (1977-1981) and the Graduate Institute of Fine Arts at National Taiwan Normal University (1982-1985) (Note: At that time, Huang Kuang-Nan's teachers included Puru, Liao Chi-chun, Lin Yushan, Chen Houei-kuen, Ma Pai-Shui, Huang Jung-ts'an, among others, with Wang Hsiu-hsiung, Cheng Shan-hsi, Huang Chun-pi, and Lin Yushan having the greatest influence on Huang's development.), obtaining a master's and doctoral degree, respectively. He continued to create and exhibit his artworks while also contributing to the development of cultural policies, publishing critiques and recommendations. Huang's artistic accomplishments during this period earned him the 20th Literary and Art Award (Chinese painting category) from the Chinese Writers and Artists Association (1979) and the first "Kaohsiung City Literary and Artistic Achievement Award" (1982).

In 1986, Huang Kuang-nan passed the civil service exam for the first-class public servant (general administrative and educational group) and was appointed as the director of the Taipei Fine Arts Museum, where he served from 1986 to 1995. Huang transitioned from a painter and teacher to a leader in arts administration, starting his administrative career. He later served as the director of the National Museum of History (1995-2004), president of the National Taiwan University of Arts (2004-2011), national policy advisor to the President's Office (2010, 2014), minister without portfolio of the Executive Yuan (2012-2014), and chairman of the Tainan City Art Museum (2019-2020). At the same time, Huang's teaching career never stopped. He became an adjunct professor of the Graduate Institute of Fine Arts at National Taiwan Normal University in 1993, and served as a full-time or part-time professor at various colleges and universities, including the National Taiwan University of Arts, National Taiwan Normal University, National Central University, Tainan National College of the Arts, National Chung Hsing University, and Yuan Ze University. In addition, Huang continues to create artworks, with exhibitions and publications to this day.

Huang Kuang-nan has received many awards and honors for his contributions to art creation, education, and administration. These awards and honors include the Ministry of Education's Cultural Medal (1988), the French Order of Arts and Letters (1988), the Chung Shing Literature and Art Award (Ink Painting) of the Taiwan Provincial Literature and Art Association (1996), the International Communication Award of the Government Information Office of the Executive Yuan (1999), the Golden Award (Art Education) of the Chinese Painting and Calligraphy Association (2006), the Honorary Literary and Artistic Award of the China Federation of Literary and Art Circles (Art) (2006), the 45th Chung Shan Literature and Art Creation Award (2010), the Second-class Order of Brilliant Star presented by the Presidential Office (2015), the First Class Medal from the French Ministry of Education (2015), the Silver Award of the 14th National Cultural and Arts Award presented by the Ministry of Culture (2019), and the 6th Art Education Contribution Award presented by the Ministry of Education (2019).
