= Organic nomenclature in Chinese =

The Chinese Chemical Society (Note: There have existed two organizations with that name since 1950, as a consequence of the inconclusive resolution of the Chinese Civil War: one based in Beijing and the other based in Taipei. The organization based in Taipei has changed its English name to Chemical Society Located in Taipei while retaining its Chinese name. Besides the usage of simplified vs. traditional components for characters and slight differences in the rules for heterocyclic nomenclature, the rules adopted by the two organizations do not differ significantly.) (CCS; simplified Chinese: 中国化学会; traditional Chinese: 中國化學會) lays out a set of rules based on those given by the International Union of Pure and Applied Chemistry (IUPAC) for the purpose of systematic organic nomenclature in Chinese. The chemical names derived from these rules are meant to correspond with the English IUPAC name in a manner that is close to one-to-one, while being adapted to and taking advantage of the logographic nature of the Chinese written language. A standard set of characters invented during the 20th century, along with characters for the chemical elements and characters corresponding to standard chemical prefixes and suffixes, are used for this purpose.

== Derivation of Chinese characters ==
The majority of the Chinese characters used for this purpose are phonosemantic compounds, with part of the character giving a general semantic category and the other part providing a pronunciation, usually based on the international (European) pronunciation. There are four common radicals (the part of the character that gives the semantic category) for these characters:

- 火 (huǒ, fire) e.g.: 烷 (wán, alkane), common for hydrocarbons
- 酉 (yǒu, ritual wine vessel) e.g.: 酮 (tóng, ketone), common for oxygenated functionalities
- 艸 (cǎo, grass) e.g. 苯 (běn, benzene, phenyl), common for aromatic compounds and terpenes
- 肉 (ròu, meat, flesh) e.g. 腙 (zōng, hydrazone), common for nitrogen-containing functionalities

Additionally, the mouth radical (口, kǒu) is affixed to characters that are used for their sound only. This occurs often in the transliteration of the names of heterocyclic compounds, (e.g., 吡啶, "bǐdìng", pyridine). These characters are also used for the transliteration of non-chemical terms from foreign languages.

== Table ==
Below is a table, in pinyin order, of the Chinese names of major organic compounds, radicals, and functional groups. Characters given are in traditional Chinese, followed by simplified Chinese where possible. Since the characters are modern creations, the traditional Chinese characters are analogous (with traditional components in place of simplified components). The Mandarin pronunciation of each character, as said in mainland China, is in pronunciation column. Any Taiwanese pronunciations that differ from the mainland Chinese pronunciations are put in the notes. Other usages of characters are etymologically unrelated to the character's meaning as names for organic compounds, radicals, and functional groups unless otherwise stated. This list is not exhaustive, although many of the other characters used for this purpose can only be found in specialist dictionaries.

Chinese names of organic compounds, radicals, and functional groups
Character	Phonetic	Pronunciation	Other meanings	Origin/Notes
胺 amine	安 ān 'peace'	àn	è (ān in Taiwan): to putrefy (of meat)'	From ammonia, 氨 ān, itself based on the European pronunciation (銨/铵 ǎn 'ammonia', with the metal radical is used for ammonium salts). Pronounced as ān in Taiwan.
薁 azulene	奥 ào 'mysterious'	ào	yù: wild grapes	European pronunciation
苯 benzene or phenyl	本 běn 'this','root'	běn	the appearance of grass growing	European pronunciation
吡啶 pyridine	比 bǐ 'compare' and 定 dìng 'stability'	bǐdìng	'slander' or 'compare' bì: bird onomatopoeia	Transliteration
吡咯 pyrrole	比 bǐ 'compare' and 各 gè 'each'	bǐluò	gē or gé: 'cackle', 'cluck', 'this', or 'pickled mustard'; kǎ (luò in Taiwan): 'to cough up'; lo, used as an end particle.	Transliteration. See note for 吡啶 for other usages for 吡
吡喃 pyran	比 bǐ 'compare' and 南 nán 'south'	bǐnán	to transliterate '-ran'.	Transliteration.
吡喃鎓/吡喃𬭩 pyrylium	比 bǐ 'compare', 南 nán 'south', and 翁 wēng 'old man':	bǐnánwēng		Combination of transliteration for 'pyran' and suffix for 'onium'.
苄 benzyl	卞 biàn 'hurried'	biàn		European pronunciation
卟吩 porphin	卜 bǔ 'foretell' and 分 fēn 'divide'	bǔfēn	卟 as 'jī': 'divination' or 'to consider' 吩: 'to instruct, command'.	Transliteration. Formerly known as 㗊 léi, which depicts the porphin ring system pictographically.
醇 alcohol	享 xiǎng 'enjoy'	chún	(formerly) rich wine	Not newly coined
噠嗪/哒嗪 pyridazine	達/达 dá 'arrive at' and 秦 qín 'Qin dynasty'	dāqín	Transliteration.	
噁唑/𫫇唑 oxazole	惡/恶 è 'evil' and 坐 zuò 'sit'	èzuò		Transliteration.
苊 acenaphthene	厄 è 'hardship'	è		European pronunciation
蒽 anthracene	恩 ēn 'favor'	ēn	a name of a grass	European pronunciation.
菲 phenanthrene	非 fēi 'not'	fēi	fragrant fěi: 'poor'.	European pronunciation.
酚 (also 苯酚) phenol	分 fēn 'divide'	fēn (běnfēn)		European pronunciation
碸/砜 sulfone	風/风 fēng 'the wind'	fēng		European pronunciation (亞碸/亚砜 yàfēng [lit. minor sulfone], is used for sulfoxide)
呋喃 furan	夫 fū 'husband' and 南 nán 'south'	fūnán	as a variant of 趺: 'back of the foot' or 'to sit cross-legged' 喃: 'chattering' or 'to mumble	Transliteration.
呋咱 furazan	夫 fū 'husband' and 自 zì 'self'	fūzán	咱: we	Transliteration
酐 (organic or inorganic) anhydride	干 gān 'dry'	gān	bitter wine	From (simplified) 干 gān 'dry'.
苷 glycoside	甘 gān 'sweet'	gān	'licorice	From 甘 gān 'sweet'. Formerly known as 甙 dài, composed of 弋 from 代 dài 'substitute' and 甘 gān 'sweet'.
胍 guanidine	瓜 guā 'melon'	guā	gū: 'large abdomen' or 'stoutness'	European pronunciation
胲 hydroxylamine	亥 hài '9-11 pm'	hǎi	gāi: 'the flesh where hair grows on the big toe', or 'prepare' gǎi: 'cheek'	European pronunciation. .
磺 sulfonyl	黃/黄 huáng 'yellow'	huáng		From 硫磺 liúhuáng 'sulfur'; e.g., 磺胺 huáng'àn (Taiwan huáng'ān) is sulfonamide
腈 nitrile	青 qīng 'blue', 'green'	jīng	pure meat	From cyanogen, 氰 qíng (Taiwan qīng), itself derived from 青 qīng, blue/green/cyan, cf. Prussian blue
肼 hydrazine	井 jǐng 'a well'	jǐng		European pronunciation
胩 isonitrile	卡 kǎ 'stop','check'	kǎ		From older nomenclature carbylamine (Also known as 異腈/异腈 yìjīng [lit. different nitrile])
蒈 carane	皆 jiē 'all'	kǎi		European pronunciation
莰 camphane	坎 kǎn 'threshold'	kǎn	European pronunciation	
喹啉 quinoline	奎 kuí 'stride' and 林 lín 'forest'	kuílín	啉: lán: 'greed', 'drink a round of wine', 'finish drinking' or 'piercing noise' lìn or làn: 'stupid'.	Transliteration.
醌 quinone	昆 kūn 'elder brother'	kūn		European pronunciation
膦 phosphine	粦 lín	lìn	liǎn: 'lack of strength'.	From 磷 lín 'phosphorus', itself from 粦 lín 'will-o'-the-wisp' (Phosphonium is 鏻/𬭸 lǐn, in analogy to ammonium). Pronounced as lín in Taiwan.
醚 ether	迷 mí 'bewilder'	mí	drunk	From 迷 mí 'confusion', from anesthetic properties of diethyl ether.
熳 mancude	曼 màn 'graceful'	màn		European pronunciation. The term mancude derives from maximum number of noncumulative double bonds. For example, a 7-membered mancude ring system has three double bonds in it (e.g. azepine, oxepine, ...).
脒 amidine	米 mǐ 'rice'	mǐ		European pronunciation
咪唑 imidazole	米 mǐ 'rice' and 坐 zuò 'sit'	mǐzuò	咪: mī: onomatopoeia for cats or used to describe the appearance of a smile.	Transliteration.
嘧啶 pyrimidine	密 mì 'dense' and 定 dìng 'stability'	mìdìng		Transliteration
萘 naphthalene	奈 nài 'persevere'	nài		European pronunciation
脲 urea	尿 niào 'urine'	niào		From 尿 niào 'urine'
薴/苧 limonene	寧/宁 níng 'peaceful'	níng	薴: messy	From 檸檬/柠檬 níngméng 'lemon'
哌啶 piperidine	𠂢 pài and 定 dìng 'stability'	pàidìng		Transliteration
哌嗪 piperazine	𠂢 pài and 秦 qín 'Qin dynasty'	pàiqín		Transliteration
蒎 pinene	派 pài 'assign'	pài		European pronunciation
苉 picene	匹 pǐ 'equal'	pǐ		European pronunciation
嘌呤 purine	票 piào 'ticket' and 令 lìng 'make'	piàolìng	嘌: piāo: 'passing swiftly' or 'speak'. 呤: líng: 'speak with a soft voice'	Transliteration. Pronounced as piāolíng in Taiwan.
羥/羟 hydroxyl	羊 yáng 'sheep' and 巠/𢀖 jīng	qiǎng	'a type of sheep'.	From fusion of the sounds of 氧 yǎng 'oxygen' and 氫/氢 qīng 'hydrogen'.
巰/巯 sulfhydryl	巠/𢀖 jīng and 硫 liú 'sulfur'	qiú		From fusion of the sounds of 氫/氢 qīng 'hydrogen' and 硫 liú 'sulfur' (Sulfonium is 鋶/锍 liǔ, in analogy with ammonium)
醛 aldehyde	荃 quán	quán	'change in the flavour of wine' or 'pickled vegetables'.	From 荃 quán, a type of fragrant grass, referring to the fragrance of many aldehydes.
炔 alkyne	夬 guǎi	quē	guì: a surname, or 'the appearance of smoke'	From 缺 quē 'deficient', referring to its unsaturation, cf. names for alkanes and alkenes. Pronounced as jué in Taiwan. .
脎 osazone	杀 shā 'kill'	sà		European pronunciation
噻唑 thiazole	塞 sāi 'to stop up' and 坐 zuò 'sit'	sāizuò		European pronunciation
胂 arsine	申 shēn 'explain'	shèn	'the flesh of the back'.	From 砷 shēn 'arsenic' (Arsonium is 鉮/𬬹 shěn, in analogy with ammonium). Pronounced as shēn in Taiwan.
酸 (organic or inorganic) acid	夋, qūn	suān	sour	Not newly coined
羧 carboxyl	n.a.	suō	zuī: woollen knitwear	Character construction is based on combination of 氧 yǎng 'oxygen' and 酸 suān 'acid', pronunciation from European pronunciation.
肽 peptide	太 tài 'excessively'	tài		European pronunciation
酞 phthalein	太 tài 'excessively'	tài		European pronunciation
羰 carbonyl	羊 yáng 'sheep' and 炭 tàn 'charcoal'	tāng		From fusion of the sounds of 氧 yǎng 'oxygen' and 碳 tàn 'carbon'. Pronounced as tàn in Taiwan.
萜 terpene	帖 tiè 'obedient'	tiē		European pronunciation
烴/烃 hydrocarbon	巠/𢀖 jīng	tīng	jǐng: 'warm', 'burnt smell' or 'the appearance of burning'	From fusion of the sounds of 碳 tàn 'carbon' and 氫/氢 qīng 'hydrogen'.
酮 ketone	同 tóng 'same'	tóng	dòng: 'bad wine'.	European pronunciation. Warning: Verbally, 酮 ('ketone') and 铜 ('copper') are both pronounced tóng and are indistinguishable. In modern times, new chemical terminology is chosen to avoid conflicts like this.
烷 alkane	完 wán 'complete'	wán	fire	From 完 wán 'complete', referring to its saturation, cf. names for alkenes and alkynes
鎓/𬭩 onium	翁 wēng 'old man'	wēng	spade	European pronunciation. Used in cases when a specific 'onium' character is unavailable or uncommon, e.g., 氧鎓/氧𬭩 yǎngwēng for 'oxonium'.
肟 oxime	亏 yú 'in, on, at'	wò		European pronunciation. Formerly known as 胜 shēng, which is also an old variant of 腥 xīng 'rank, strong-smelling', as well as the simplified character for 勝 shèng/shēng 'victory' or 'excel'. Note that 亏 is also the unrelated simplified character for 虧 kuī 'deficit', but in this context, it is the archaic variant character for 于 yú 'in, on, at'.
芴 fluorene	勿 wù 'do not'	wù	an edible wild plant hū: 'dimly' or 'suddenly'	European pronunciation
烯 alkene	希 xī 'infrequent'	xī	the colour of fire	From 希 xī 'sparse', referring to its unsaturation, cf. names for alkanes and alkynes
酰 (organic or inorganic) acyl	先 xiān 'in front'	xiān		From 先 xiān 'earlier [i.e. precursor]', referring to its derivation from acids. Formerly known as 醯 xī, which also means 'acid, vinegar'.
𨦡 oxonium	羊 yáng 'goat; sheep'	yáng		From oxygen, 氧 yǎng
吲哚 indole	引 yǐn 'attract' and 朵 duǒ	yǐnduǒ		Transliteration
茚 indene	印 yìn 'impression'	yìn	a name of a grass	European pronunciation.
甾 steroid	甾 zāi 'steroid'	zāi	a variant of 災/灾: zāi: 'calamity' zī: 'an ancient pottery used for containing wine'	Pictographic in origin, referring to the three side-chains (found in cholesterol) and four rings found in all steroids.
酯 ester	旨 zhǐ 'purpose'	zhǐ		From 脂 zhī 'lipid', referring to the ester linkages in glycerides. Formerly known as 𨤎 yán.
䓬 tropylium	卓 zhuó 'eminent'	zhuó		European pronunciation
腙 hydrazone	宗 zōng 'faction'	zōng		European pronunciation

== Other aspects and examples ==
In the CCS system, carbon chain lengths are denoted by celestial stems (甲 jiǎ, 乙 yǐ, 丙 bǐng, 丁 dīng, 戊 wù, 己 jǐ, 庚 gēng, 辛 xīn, 壬 rén, 癸 guǐ), characters used since the Shang dynasty (16th–11th centuries BCE) for naming days (and later, to name years). For example, hexane is 己烷 jǐwán, since 己 jǐ is the sixth celestial stem. Longer carbon chains are specified by number followed by '碳' tàn 'carbon'. For example, 1-hexadecene is 1-十六碳烯 (read as [1, yī] [-, wèi] [十六, shíliù, '16'] [碳, tàn] [烯, xī]), where the hyphen is read as 位 (wèi, 'position').

For a more complex example, consider 3-buten-1-ol. Its Chinese name is 3-丁烯-1-醇 (read as [3, sān] [-, wèi] [丁, dīng] [烯, xī] [1, yī] [-, wèi] [醇, chún]).

The descriptors for degree of substitution, primary, secondary, tertiary, and quaternary, are translated as 伯 (bó), 仲 (zhòng), 叔 (shū), 季 (jì), which refer to the first, second, third, and fourth male siblings in a family. For instance, tert-butyllithium is translated as 叔丁基锂 ([叔, shū, 'tert'], [丁, dīng, 'but-'], [基, jī, 'yl'], [锂, lǐ, 'lithium']). Other commonly used isomeric descriptors normal-, iso-, and neo- are translated as 正 (zhèng, 'proper'), 异 (yì, 'different'), and 新 (xīn, 'new'), respectively.

The numerical prefix bis- is translated as 双 (shuāng, 'double'), while larger multiplicities are simply given by the Chinese word for the number (e.g., 四 (sì, 'four') for tetrakis-). For example, tetrakis(triphenylphosphine)palladium is rendered 四(三苯基膦)钯, in which 三苯基膦 is triphenylphosphine and 钯 is palladium. The prefix bi- (for joining of ring systems) is translated as 联 (lián, 'join', 'couple'), as in 联苯 for biphenyl.

The stereochemical descriptors cis- and trans- are translated as 顺 (shùn, 'along') and 反 (fǎn, 'against'). The relational prefixes ortho-, meta-, and para- are translated as 邻 (lín, 'neighboring'), 间 (jiàn, 'between'), and 对 (duì, 'opposing'), respectively.

The structural modification descriptors cyclo-, nor- and homo- are translated as 环 (huán, 'ring'), 降 (jiàng, 'lowered'), and 高 (gāo, 'high'). For example, norbornene is translated as 降冰片烯, in which the trivial name (冰片) for bornyl [literally, camphor] is used. When substitutive nomenclature is used for naming heterocycles, the suffix 杂 (zá, 'mixed') is used in the same way as '-a' in English (as in aza, thia, oxa, etc.). As an example, DABCO (1,4-diazabicylo[2.2.2]octane) is named 1,4-二氮杂二环［2.2.2］辛烷.

The common unsaturated groups allyl and propargyl are translated as 烯丙(基) (xībǐng(jī), 'alkene-prop-(yl)') and 炔丙(基) (qūebǐng(jī), 'alkyne-prop-(yl)'). Thus, using 高 for homo- and 烯丙 for allyl, 3-buten-1-ol is also called 高烯丙醇 (i.e., homoallyl alcohol) in Chinese via semisystematic nomenclature.

The Chinese Wikipedia page may be consulted for further details.

=== Pseudohalogens ===
- The character 氯 ( lǜ, "chlorine") may on occasion mean Cl (one atom), or the bonded pair Cl_{2} (the molecule, the usual form of chlorine). Likewise in describing pseudohalogens, 氰 (qíng) may on occasion mean a single CN^{−} cyanide ion (e.g. as in 氰化鉀 (qínghuàjiǎ, potassium cyanide, literally "cyanide-ion transform potassium"), or the bonded pair (CN)_{2} or NCCN ("cyanogen"). The similar (not identical) character 腈 (jīng) means "nitrile".

== Thermochemical terminology ==
Although not substances, the thermochemical concepts entropy and enthalpy were assigned Chinese characters based on similar considerations. The 'fire' radical, 火, is used as the semantic category. The character for entropy, 熵 (pinyin: shāng), is derived from 商 (pinyin: shāng), which means 'quotient' in this context. This recognizes the Clausius equation for the differential change in entropy as the differential heat absorbed divided by the temperature: dS = dQ/T. The character for enthalpy, 焓 (pinyin: hán), is derived from 含 (pinyin: hán), which means 'to contain.' This character phonetically approximates the first syllable of 'enthalpy', and recognizes the definition of enthalpy as heat content.

== See also ==
- Chemical elements in East Asian languages
