= Karen L. Wooley =

American chemist

- Born: Oakridge, Oregon, U.S.
- Education: Oregon State University (BSc); Cornell University (PhD)
- Awards: ACS Award in Polymer Chemistry (2014); National Academy of Sciences (2020); National Academy of Engineering (2026); Hill Prize in Physical Sciences (2026); Linus Pauling Medal (2026)
- Scientific career
- Fields: Polymer chemistry, materials science, nanomedicine
- Workplaces: Washington University in St. Louis; Texas A&M University
- Thesis: Design, Synthesis and Properties of Dendritic Macromolecules (1993)
- Doctoral advisor: Jean Fréchet

Karen L. Wooley is an American polymer chemist. She is a University Distinguished Professor and holds the W. T. Doherty-Welch Chair in Chemistry at Texas A&M University, where her research focuses on degradable polymers from natural products and nanostructured materials. Previously, she was the James S. McDonnell Distinguished University Professor in Arts & Sciences at Washington University in St. Louis. She is a member of the National Academy of Sciences and the National Academy of Engineering.

== Early life and education ==
Wooley was born and raised in Oakridge, Oregon, a small logging community in the mountains of Oregon. She received her B.S. in chemistry from Oregon State University in 1988 and a Ph.D. in polymer/organic chemistry from Cornell University in 1993 under the guidance of Jean Fréchet, with a dissertation titled "Design, Synthesis and Properties of Dendritic Macromolecules".

== Career ==
Wooley is internationally recognized as a leader in the area of multifunctional macromolecules (polymers and related materials). She is credited with bringing a design-based synthetic approach to the field of polymer chemistry; an approach traditionally reserved for small molecule synthetic targets like natural products. She is a fellow of the American Academy of Arts and Sciences and the National Academy of Inventors, and a member of the National Academy of Sciences and the National Academy of Engineering. She has published more than 370 peer-reviewed papers and is an inventor on more than 20 patents and patent applications.

Wooley's career in academia began in 1993 as an assistant professor in the Department of Chemistry in Arts & Sciences at Washington University in St. Louis, where she was promoted to full professor in 1999 and installed as the James S. McDonnell Distinguished University Professor in Arts & Sciences in 2006. Wooley also was affiliated with the Department of Radiology at the Washington University School of Medicine through a joint appointment granted in 2007 as part of her collaborations in the area of radiotherapeutics with the late Michael Welch (1939–2012). In July 2009, Wooley moved to Texas A&M University, where she holds the W. T. Doherty-Welch Chair in Chemistry. She was named a University Distinguished Professor in 2011 and one of the university's 24 inaugural Presidential Impact Fellows in 2017. She is a professor of chemistry and, since 2014, of materials science and engineering, and held an appointment in chemical engineering from 2009 to 2021. She also serves as director of the Laboratory for Synthetic-Biologic Interactions.

Wooley served on the editorial advisory board of the Journal of the American Chemical Society from 2007 to 2014, as an associate editor from 2014 to 2021, and as its executive editor in 2021. She was an editor of the Journal of Polymer Science, Part A: Polymer Chemistry from 2003 to 2014 and has served on the editorial board of Progress in Polymer Science since 2018. She chaired the National Institutes of Health Nanotechnology Study Section from 2012 to 2014. She has also served as a technical advisor and consultant for companies ranging from Fortune 500 firms to start-ups and law firms.

Wooley's research interests include the synthesis and characterization of degradable polymers derived from natural products, unique macromolecular architectures and complex polymer assemblies, and the design and development of nanostructured materials. She has designed synthetic strategies to harness the compositional, regiochemical and stereochemical complexity of natural products for the construction of hydrolytically-degradable polymers, which have impact toward sustainability, reduction of reliance on petrochemicals, and production of biologically-beneficial and environmentally-benign natural products upon degradation. Wooley's research team is engaged in creative approaches to materials for nanomedicine applications, degradable polymers from natural resources, coatings for marine antifouling, advanced photoresist materials for the microelectronics industry, hybrid magnetic nanomaterials for environmental remediation, and other projects of fundamental and applied nature. In 2023 her group reported biodegradable plastics, including superabsorbent hydrogels, made from chitin extracted from discarded black soldier fly carcasses. With Teysha Technologies, her group has developed polymers that turn plant-derived sugars and phenolic compounds into alternatives to bisphenol A. Her work on drug and gene targeting and delivery led Clarivate to name her a Citation Laureate in 2023.

Since 2018 Wooley has been chief technology officer of Teysha Technologies, a biodegradable plastics company founded by Matthew Stone. Teysha licensed Texas A&M University System bioplastics technology, mainly polycarbonates made from bio-sourced feedstocks, under a sponsored research agreement with the university. Wooley and the Teysha team are developing biodegradable plastics from biomass that can be tuned to decompose within set timescales. In 2026 Wooley and Stone received the Hill Prize in Physical Sciences for this work. She is also the co-founder and president of Sugar Plastics, LLC, which she started in 2017.

== Awards ==
Wooley's early-career honors include a National Science Foundation National Young Investigator Award (1994), an Army Research Office Young Investigator Award (1996), an Office of Naval Research Young Investigator Award (1998) and the Arthur C. Cope Scholar Award (2002). She received the American Chemical Society Division of Polymer Chemistry's Herman F. Mark Scholar Award in 2009 and was named a founding fellow of the division in 2010.

In 2014 she received the American Chemical Society Award in Polymer Chemistry and the Royal Society of Chemistry Centenary Prize, and was elected a Fellow of the Royal Society of Chemistry and an honorary fellow of the Chinese Chemical Society. She received the Oesper Award from the University of Cincinnati in 2015, and in 2016 the Texas A&M Association of Former Students gave her its Distinguished Achievement Awards for both research and college-level teaching.

She was elected a Fellow of the American Academy of Arts and Sciences in 2015, of the National Academy of Inventors in 2019, and of the American Association for the Advancement of Science and the American Institute for Medical and Biological Engineering in 2020. She was elected a member of the National Academy of Sciences in 2020 and of the National Academy of Engineering in 2026, becoming the first woman at Texas A&M to belong to both. She is also a member of the Texas Academy of Medicine, Engineering, Science and Technology (2020) and the New York Academy of Sciences (2025).

She was named the 2021 Southeastern Conference (SEC) Professor of the Year, Texas A&M's second recipient of the honor. In 2023 Clarivate named her a Citation Laureate in chemistry "for the development of innovative drug and gene targeting and delivery methods", and Texas A&M's College of Arts and Sciences gave her its Outstanding Career Award.

In 2026 she and Matthew Stone of Teysha Technologies received the Hill Prize in Physical Sciences from TAMEST and Lyda Hill Philanthropies, which carries $500,000 in funding; she is the first Texas A&M faculty member to receive a Hill Prize. That year she also received the Linus Pauling Medal from the Puget Sound, Oregon and Portland sections of the American Chemical Society, and she was named the recipient of the 2027 William H. Nichols Medal by the ACS New York Section.
