= The Beauty of Taroko =

Paintings of Taroko Gorge by Ma Pai-sui

The Beauty of Taroko (太魯閣之美) is a large-scale ink painting created by Ma Pai-Shui in early 1999. It consists of twenty-four pieces of Xuan paper, each measuring 214 cm in height and 69 cm in width, forming a total dimension of 1656 cm in width and 214 cm in height. The painting is divided into six main themes, showcasing the distinctive seasonal landscapes of Taroko. In 2015, it was designated as a nationally significant antiquity by the Ministry of Culture of the Republic of China.

== Themes and artistic expression ==
The Beauty of Taroko consists of twenty-four linked screens, each bearing the signature of Ma Pai-Shui. Four screens in each set are titled to represent different themes, resulting in a total of six main themes: "Spring Breeze," "Summer Rain," "Autumn Red," "Winter White," "Sunlight," and "Moonlight." These themes sequentially depict the various seasons and landscapes of Taroko from sunrise to sunset, spanning from sea level to an altitude of 300 meters. Furthermore, each theme is centered around a renowned landmark in Taroko: the "Spring Breeze" focuses on the gateway, "Summer Rain" highlights the Changchun Shrine, "Autumn Red" portrays the Jin Heng Bridge, "Winter White" captures the Nine Turns Tunnel, "Sunlight" centers on the Cimu Pavilion, and "Moonlight" showcases the towering Tianfeng Tower. Through this artwork, Ma Pai-Shui presents the unique cultural and geographical features of Taiwan's eastern region. Additionally, scholar Huang Yongchuan suggests that the twenty-four linked screens can be viewed in groups of three to represent different time periods, including early morning, morning, late morning, noon, afternoon, evening, dusk, and nighttime, capturing the ever-changing scenery of Taroko under different lighting conditions.In order to depict the majestic and grand landscapes of eastern Taiwan, Ma Pai-Shui employed an innovative "multi-in-one composition" method to enhance the visual impact of the artwork. By subjectively interpreting and rearranging the scenery of Taroko in the composition, the artwork not only allows each screen to stand independently as a complete scene but also offers flexibility in displaying the artwork by combining two, three, four, or six screens, depending on the available exhibition space. Furthermore, according to scholar Huang Yongchuan, when all twenty-four screens are connected, viewers are presented with a panoramic visual experience akin to watching a wide-screen display.

In terms of painting techniques, the majority of this artwork features powerful and concise brushstrokes to outline the mountains, complemented by flat and rendered colors, as well as variations in the density of ink, creating a fusion of the rich texture of traditional ink painting and the vibrant hues of Western watercolor.

This artwork made its debut in September 1999 as part of Ma Pai-Shui's retrospective exhibition titled "A Retrospective of Ma Pai-Shui at Ninety" held at the National Museum of History, where it was specially created for the exhibition. It is now a permanent collection of the National Museum of History.

== Reception ==
This artwork, created by Ma Pai-Shui at the age of ninety, demonstrates his attempt to integrate both Eastern and Western painting styles and techniques. On December 17, 2015, it was designated as a significant antiquity by the Ministry of Culture.

== Related public art ==
In 2016, Hualien Xincheng Railway Station adorned its lobby with this artwork through kiln-fired glass decoration, incorporating a dimming system. By manipulating the intensity of lighting, it vividly portrays the changing seasons and all-day light and shadow variations of the Taroko Gorge. Additionally, in collaboration with Taroko National Park and the National Museum of History, the "Ma Pai-Shui Painted Train" was launched. In 2018, Xincheng Station received the "Artistic Creation Award" and the "Environmental Integration Award" at the 6th Public Art Awards organized by the Ministry of Culture. The judging committee of the Ministry of Culture expressed that this public art piece, designed based on the painting Beauty of Taroko Gorge, revives "forgotten masterful techniques and endangered traditional skills" in front of the public.
