= Chinese Chemical Society =

Chinese Chemical Society may refer to:

- Chinese Chemical Society (Taipei), a major Taiwanese scholarly organization dedicated to chemistry
- Chinese Chemical Society (Beijing), a major Chinese scholarly organization dedicated to chemistry
- Chinese-American Chemical Society, an organization of Chinese chemists and chemical engineers
