= Cui Ruzhuo =

Chinese painter

- Born: 1944 (age 81–82)
- Known for: Painting

Cui Ruzhuo (崔如琢; born 1944) is a Chinese painter and calligrapher. He has won many awards, and he was found in 2016 to be the third most successful living artist based on secondary market sales.

== Early life and career ==
Cui studied under the painter and calligrapher Li Kuchan. He then taught at the Academy of Arts and Design in Beijing.

His work has not been limited to mainland China. Cui moved to the United States in 1981. In 1989, Cui's work was exhibited in the National Museum of History at 49 Nan Hai Road, Taipei, Taiwan, Republic of China. Cui returned to Mainland China in the mid-1990s and mentoring doctoral students at the Chinese National Academy of Art.

== Work ==
Cui has been described as one of China's more traditional ink painters, giving a "modern take on" historical Chinese ink paintings.

== Exhibitions ==
He had a successful 2016 exhibition in Saint Petersburg, Russia.

== Recognition ==
In The Moscow Times, Dudley Baxter argued, "Cui’s work is poetic and calming. Standing before one of his scenes is meditative, and it’s easy to forget you’re only meters away from Mokhovaya Street and the relentless traffic outside."

== Art market ==
His work Lotus, painted in 2011, sold for $15.9 million.

His painting Landscape in Snow sold for HK$184 million ($23.7 million) in 2014.

His 2012 painting Snowy Mountain, which sold for HK$28.75 million ($3.7 million) at the Grand Hyatt hotel in Hong Kong, was infamously removed by cleaners, kicked to a garbage pile by a guard, and taken away by janitors. Gladis Young, director of communications at the hotel, said hotel staff were not responsible because auctioneers usually hired external staff. The case was initially classified as theft but later as "lost property".

The eight-panel painting series The Grand Snowing Mountainous Jiangnan Landscape, completed in 2013, sold for HK$236 million ($30 million) in 2015, a record for living Asian artists.

The Grand Snowing Mountains, also completed in 2013, sold for $39.6 million in 2016, making it the fifth most expensive work by a living artist.
