= Huang Weiyuan =

Chinese organic chemist (1921–2015)

Huang Weiyuan (Chinese: 黄维垣; December 15, 1921 – November 17, 2015) was a Chinese organic chemist and an academician of the Chinese Academy of Sciences. He served as President of the Shanghai Institute of Organic Chemistry and President of the Chinese Chemical Society.

== Early life and education ==
Huang was born in Putian, Fujian, China on December 15, 1921. He graduated from Fukien Christian University in 1943 with a bachelor's degree in chemistry. After earning his MS in 1949 from Lingnan University in Guangzhou, he entered Harvard University and received his Ph.D. in 1952. His graduate advisor was the organic chemist Louis Fieser.

== Career ==
Huang joined the Shanghai Institute of Organic Chemistry (SIOC), Chinese Academy of Sciences in 1955. In 1958, he responded to the demand of Chinese defense industry, stopped his established organic natural product research work and pursued research in the field of organofluorine chemistry. Under his leadership, the major base for organofluorine chemistry in China was established at the SIOC.

Huang discovered the sulfinatodehalogenation reaction in 1981, which converts perfluoroalkyl halides to the corresponding perfluoroalkanesulfinates with sulfinatodehalogenation reagents such as sodium dithionite. He and his students identified this reaction as a single electron transfer reaction. This reaction opens a new and practical way for perfluoroalkylation of unsaturated substrates such as alkenes alkynes and aromatics compounds with sulfinatodehalogenation reagents. This reaction is well documented internationally and he won the Second-class Award of National Natural Science in 1986.

Huang has published more than 200 research papers and has mentored twenty Ph.D. candidates, including the first Ph.D. in Organic Chemistry in Mainland China. He was the first one in China (1958) to introduce NMR and IR applications in organic chemistry.

He was elected as an academician of the Chinese Academy of Sciences in 1980. Huang was deputy director of SIOC (1978-1984) and director from 1984-1987. SIOC is the major Chinese chemistry research center and the place edits and publishes several major Chinese academic journals of chemistry.

Huang was the founder and chief editor of the Chinese Journal of Chemistry. He was elected as President of the Chinese Chemical Society (1986-1990).

Huang was in the first delegation from the Chinese chemist community to visit USA in 1977 and he made great efforts to establish the good relationship in exchange of scholars and visiting between Chinese and American chemists.

Huang received broad recognition from international chemistry community. He was elected as bureau member of IUPAC (1985-1993). He was awarded the Moissan Medal in 1986 at the conference "Centenary of the Discovery of Fluorine" in Paris. He was the co-chairman of 17th international symposium of fluorine chemistry in 2003.

== Death ==
Huang died in the United States on November 17, 2015, aged 93.
