= Lin Lanying =

Chinese materials scientist

- Born: February 7, 1918; Putian, Fujian, China
- Died: March 4, 2003 (aged 85); Beijing, China
- Education: Fukien Christian University, bachelor's degree in Physics; Dickinson College, bachelor's degree in Mathematics; University of Pennsylvania, master's degree in Solid-state Physics, doctorate degree in Solid-state Physics
- Known for: First mono-crystalline silicon and gallium arsenide in China
- Awards: CAS S&T Progress Award; Henry Fok Award
- Scientific career
- Workplaces: Institute of Semiconductor CAS

Lin Lanying (Chinese: 林兰英; February 7, 1918 – March 4, 2003) was a Chinese electrical engineer, materials scientist, physicist, and politician. She is called the "mother of aerospace materials" and the "mother of semiconductor materials" in China.

In 1957, she returned to China and became a researcher at the Institute of Physics CAS. She then moved to the Institute of Semiconductor CAS and spent her research life there.

Among her many contributions include manufacturing China's first monocrystalline silicon, and the first mono-crystal furnace used to extract silicon in China. She laid the foundation of development in microelectronics and optoelectronics. She was responsible for developing extensive materials in a high-purified vapor phase and liquid phase and led China to become the world leader.

She was honored as Academician of Chinese Academy of Sciences and became the vice president of China Association for Science and Technology. She received the National S&T Progress Award twice, and the first prize in CAS S&T Progress Award four times. In 1998, she was given the Henry Fok Achievement Award. In the political field, she was selected as a deputy to the National People's Congress and as a member of its Standing Committee.

== Early life ==
Lin was born in Putian City, Fujian Province, in southern China.

Lin Lanying was the first child born into a large and prestigious family, which could be traced back to the Ming dynasty 600 years before. Her sisters became child brides or were killed. Before she was six years old, Lanying was required to wash clothes and cook for the whole family.

Her ancestor Lin Run was an imperial censor during the Ming Dynasty. This was an official position that controlled and supervised other government officials. During his career he faced two influential persons who challenged state authority. By helping the emperor deal with these two challengers, the emperor gave him money to build a house in Putian, which is now called the Old House of Lin Run. Lin were all born and raised in this house.

=== Education ===
At age six, she wanted to go to school rather than housework and chatting with other women all day. The only escape was via education. Her mother was deeply influenced by Chinese social gender norms and forbid her to get an education. Lin locked herself in her room and swore that she would not eat unless she was allowed to go to school. Her mother was moved by her insistence, and finally allowed her to attend Liqing primary school. Lin often got the best grades in her class, while she was required to do all the washing and cooking. Then came studying that often kept her up to 12 AM. She got up to cook and then went to school. Her habit of sleeping six hours continued throughout her life.

She fought a similar battle to continue to Liqing middle school. Her mother said that as a female, literacy did not matter. She convinced her mother that if she did not need money to study, she could go. This middle school provided scholarships for students who got the three best grades each semester. Lin earned her scholarship every semester.

After finishing middle school, she enrolled in Putian high school. Her mother finally accepted her studies because of her success in middle school. However, Lin stayed in this school for only one year. Japan went to war with China and killed many Chinese people. A lot of the students became angry and held many parades to boycott Japan. Many Japanese soldiers and agents were in China, so the parades were suppressed and some students were killed. Lin transferred to a women's school called Hami Lton School. One of her teachers came from the United States and could not speak Chinese very well, so many of her classmates could not understand his courses. Lin helped the teacher as an assistant. When the teacher taught something in English, Lanying Lin would translate. Because of this, she was called 'little teacher'.

She continued her study at Fukien Christian University, a top university at that time in China. She graduated at age 22 with a bachelor's degree in Physics as one of the best in her class. She worked at the university for 8 years, four years as an assistant to teach some fundamental courses such as mechanics. Her first book was Course for Experiments in Optics and earned certification as a professor.

=== Education in the United States ===
Fukien Christian University had exchange programs with New York University at that time and many teachers who worked more than 2 years could study abroad. However, because she was not a Christian, she was excluded. So she applied to attend Dickinson College and earned a full scholarship and another bachelor's degree in mathematics with the help of her workmate Lairong Li in 1931. She then studied solid state physics at the University of Pennsylvania. In 1955, she received a doctorate degree there in solid-state physics and became the first Chinese national in a hundred years to earn a doctorate degree there. She thought that compared with math, physics was more applicable and more useful for China.

== Career ==
=== United States ===
Lanying wanted to return to China after graduation. However, the Chinese political situation was not good. At that time, the United States had many opportunities for scientists and including international students. Many Chinese students were not allowed to repatriate. Through the recommendation of her professor at the University of Pennsylvania, she decided to work as a senior engineer at the Sylvania Company which mainly manufactured semiconductors. At that time, the company had failed several times in making mono-crystalline silicon. Lanying discovered the problems and helped the company successfully engineer the silicon technology.

=== China ===
After Lin had worked in America for a year, China signed a treaty during the Geneva Conference in 1956 that covered international students. On 6 January 1957, Lin returned to China after eight years. Just before she boarded, the Federal Bureau of Investigation approached her and threatened to withhold her earnings for the year of US$6,800, to persuade her to stay. Lin accepted this and boarded the ship.

Her family stayed poor because her salary was only 207 RMB, or 20 dollars a month. Her workplace had little money. However, she never gave up. In 1957, her workplace-Institute of Semiconductor CAS—finished making the first mono-crystalline germanium in China. By virtue of her experience in Sylvania Company, she knew the processes for making mono-crystalline silicon. However, she could not get equipment because of embargoes from other countries. She changed the process and made China's first mono-crystalline silicon in 1958. China became the third country to make mono-crystalline silicon. In 1962, she designed the mono-crystal furnace. This furnace was licensed to many countries. In the same year, she made the first mono-crystalline gallium arsenide in China. Lin's gallium arsenide achieved the highest mobility until that time.

The Cultural Revolution intervened. From 1966 to 1976, billions of people in China suffered from it. All educators and scientists were suppressed. Lin was not allowed to do research and had to stay in her room under the monitoring of authorities. Lin's educator father died during an assaulted by young people.

Despite the tragedy, she worked at age 60 after the Cultural Revolution. She found that the dislocation density of existing gallium arsenide was large due to gravity and not good enough to use, so she decided to make the experiment in artificial satellites. This was a dangerous experiment because the melting point of gallium arsenide is 1,238 Celsius degrees. However, she finished successfully and became the world's first to do so. Because of this work in gallium arsenide, the Chinese government named a gallium arsenide company (Chinese: 中科稼英) after her in 2001.

At age 78, in 1996, she was diagnosed with cancer. She had been working on building the semiconductor base in the southern part of China. When she was diagnosed, she asked, "Can someone give me another ten years? In ten years, I can definitely finish what I am doing and I can die with no regrets!" She wanted those years to offset the ten years lost to the Cultural Revolution. At 1:00 p.m. on March 4, 2003, she died.

== Opinions about gender issues ==
Throughout her life, she faced difficulties as a female. After she returned from the US, she joined the All-China Women's Federation. She held a lot of conferences and talked about gender issues. As a woman, she never accepted gender roles and always fought for herself. She believed that in the science field, women and men are equal and that the reason why fewer women are in this field is that women are more easily distracted by e.g., gossip, so women have to memorize more unrelated things and cannot focus on work.

== Personal relationships ==
=== Qichang Guan and Cheng Lin ===
Lin did not marry, but she loved two men. The first was Qichang Guan. Lanying and Qichang were in different classes of the same middle school. After graduation Qichang went to another city with his parents, so they separated. But they continued their relationship by mail. Qichang told Lanying that he wanted to marry her and work as teachers in a middle school. However, Lanying was more ambitious. They gradually stopped writing to each other. At the age of 17, Qichang died due to leukemia.

She also loved Cheng Lin. They met at Fukien Christian University. They had the same interests and both were ambitious. After graduation, they both stayed at this university and worked as teachers. However, because Lanying wanted to learn more things and decided to go to America, they separated. Cheng Lin married after Lin went to America. Their story has been told in the novel The Second Handshake.

== Attributions and honors ==
Lin was recognized in many forums:

- 1957: Made the first mono-crystalline germanium (N-style and P-style) in China and laid the foundation for the development of transistor radios.
- 1958: Made the mono-crystalline gallium antimonide
- 1958: November, Made the first mono-crystalline silicon
- 1959: Made the mono-crystalline cadmium sulfide
- 1960: Made the extensive materials for silicon
- 1962: Made the first mono-crystal furnace named TDK in China
- 1962: Made the first mono-crystalline silicon with no malposition in China
- 1962: Made the first mono-crystalline indium antimonide with the highest purification
- 1962: Made the first mono-crystalline gallium arsenide
- 1963: Made the first semiconductor laser in China
- 1963: Made high-purified silicon and received the second prize of The Achievements of National Science and Technology Award
- 1964: Designed the process of making silicon with low malposition and received the second prize of The Achievements of National Science and Technology Award
- 1974: Made the first mono-crystalline gallium arsenide with no malposition
- 1978: Received the CAS Important Achievements of Science and Technology Award
- 1981: Made the integrated circuit and received the CAS Important Achievements of Science and Technology Award
- 1986: Made the SOS-CMOS integrated circuit and received the third prize of The Achievements of National Science and Technology Award
- 1989: Research on GaInAsSb/InP extensive material and received the second prize of The Achievements of National Science and Technology Award
- 1989: Successfully made the experiment for melting the gallium arsenide in artificial satellites and received the third prize of The Achievements of National Science and Technology Award
- 1990-1991: Received the third prize of The Achievements of National Science and Technology Award four times
- 1991: Made a satellite by using 5 different circuits of SOS-CMOS integrated circuit
- 1992: Made the mono-crystalline indium phosphide
- 1998: Made the effective gallium arsenide solar cells by liquefying the extensive materials
- 1990-2000: Led the research on SiC, GaN material and raised the new growth technology in high temperature materials

== Social activities ==
Her social activities include:

- 1959: Went to the Soviet Academy of Science and worked for 1 month
- 1963: Went to Moscow, Soviet and took part in the International Semiconductor Conference
- 1963: Went to Czechoslovakia Prague and took part in the International Semiconductor material Conference
- 1971: Visited Thailand with the vice-chairman of the Chinese people's political consultative Committee Ying Zheng
- 1972: Met with woman scientist JianXiong Wu with Prime Minister Enlai Zhou
- 1978: Visited France and Germany with workmates in CAS and went to Japan to join the International Conference on Thin Film Materials
- 1980: Went to North Korea to make presentations and met with president of North Korea Kim Il Sung
- 1985: Visited America with delegation of National People's Congress
- 1986: August, Went to federal Germany and took part in scientific seminars about aerospace materials
- 1987: Joined the International Conference of Women Parliamentarians
- 1987: Visited America with the delegation of the National Association for Science and Technology and joined American Association for the Advancement of Science (AAAS)
- 1988: September 27–30, Joined the conference hold in Chicago named "World Material—Space Processing Conference"
- 1988: October 3–7, Joined the conference named "Women's Influence on the Development of the Third World Science" which was held by the Third World Academy of Science (TWAS) at Lee Jast, Italy
- 1989: August 20–26, Joined the Aerospace Material Conference held by National Aeronautics and Space Administration (NASA)
- 1989: October, Joined the Thirteenth International Conference on Amorphous Semiconductor in America with Guanglin Kong
- 1990: Visited Sweden, then visited Moscow State University
- 1994: October, Made the report about the growth of gallium arsenide in aerospace at the Hong Kong University of Science and Technology
- 1995: Joined the Thirty-first United Nations' World Conference on Women with the delegation of Chinese government
- 1996: Joined the Conference of Committee for Space Research in Bremen, Germany

== Political activities ==
Lin participated in various political activities:

- 1962: Became vice-chairman of All-China Youth Federation
- 1964: December, Became the deputy to the Third National People's Congress and a member of the Standing Committee of the National People's Congress
- 1975: January, Became the deputy to the Fourth National People's Congress
- 1978: February, Became the deputy to the Fifth National People's Congress
- 1978: September—1983, became a member of the All-China Women's Federation (ACWF)
- 1978: Became a committee member of Chinese Institute of Electronics (CIE)
- 1979: July, Became the managing director of Chinese Institute of Electronics (CIE)
- 1980: April, Became the second vice-president of China Association for Science and Technology (CAST)
- 1981: May, Became the managing director of technology department of Chinese Academy of Science (CAS)
- 1982: September, Became the delegate of 12th National Congress of the Chinese Communist Party (CCP)
- 1983: May, Became the deputy to the Sixth National People's Congress
- 1986: Became the third vice-president of China Association for Science and Technology (CAST)
- 1988: March, Became the deputy to the Seventh National People's Congress and a member of the Standing Committee of the National People's Congress
- 1988: Became the honorary director of Chinese Institute of Electronics (CIE)
- 1991: Became the fourth vice-president of China Association for Science and Technology (CAST)
- 1993: March, Became the deputy to the Eighth National People's Congress and a member of the Standing Committee of the National People's Congress
- 1996: Became the director of National Key Laboratory of Microgravity

== Selected publications ==
Among her many publications are:

- Dislocations and Precipitates in Semi-Insulating Gallium Arsenide Revealed by Ultrasonic Abrahams-Buiocchi Etching
- Stoichiometric Defects in Semi-Insulating GaAs
- Interface Roughness Scattering in GaAs-AlGaAs Modulation-Doped Heterostructures
- Growth of GaAs Single Crystals at High Gravity
- Improvement of Stoichiometry in Semi-Insulating Gallium Arsenide Grown under Microgravity
- Magnetospectroscopy of Bound Phonons in High Purity GaAs
- Influence of DX centers in the AlxGa12xAs barrier on the low-temperature density and mobility of the two-dimensional electron gas in GaAs/AlGaAs modulation-doped heterostructure
- Influence of the semi-insulating GaAs Schottky pad on the Schottky barrier in the active layer
- Backgating and Light Sensitivity in GaAs Metal-Semiconductor Field Effect Transistors
- Photon Energy Dependence of SW Effect in α-Si:H Films
- Neutron Irradiation-Infrared Based Measurement Method for Interstitial Oxygen in Heavily Boron-Doped Silicon
- Properties and Applications of GaAs Single Crystal Grown under Microgravity Conditions
- Preliminary Results of GaAs Single Crystal Growth under High Gravity Conditions
- Spatial Distributions of Impurities and Defects in Te-and Si-doped GaAs Grown in a Reduced Gravity Environment
- Microdefects and electrical uniformity of InP annealed in phosphorus and iron phosphide ambiances
- Formation, structure and fluorescence of CdS clusters in a mesoporous zeolite
- Fabrication of novel double-hetero-epitaxial SOI structure Si/γ-Al_{2}O_{3}/Si
- Photostimulated luminescence of silver clusters in zeolite-Y
- Characterization of defects and whole wafer uniformity of annealed undoped semi-insulating InP wafers
- Very low-pressure VLP-CVD growth of high quality γ-Al_{2}O_{3}films on silicon by multi-step process
- Some new observation on the formation and optical properties of CdS clusters in zeolite-Y
- Absorption spectra of Se_{8}-ring clusters in zeolite 5A
- Growth of GaSb and GaAsSb in the single phase region by MOVPE
- Growth and properties of high purity LPE-GaAs
- New color centers and photostimulated luminescence of BaFCl:Eu^{2+}
- Channeling analysis of self-implanted and recrystallized silicon on sapphire
- Semi-insulating GaAs grown in outer space
- Neutron irradiation induced photoluminescence from silicon crystal grown in ambient hydrogen
- The influence of thickness on properties of GaN buffer layer and heavily Si-doped GaN grown by metalorganic vapor-phase epitaxy
- The dependence of growth rate of GaN buffer layer on growth parameters by metalorganic vapor-phase epitaxy
- Self-organization of the InGaAs/GaAs quantum dots superlattice
- Thermoluminescence of CdS clusters in zeolite-Y

== See also ==
- Timeline of women in science
