= Huang Nianlai =

Chinese mycologist and politician (1939–2022)

Member of the National People's Congress
- In office June 1983 – March 1993
- Constituency: Fujian Provincial Delegation of the National People's Congress

Personal details
- Born: November 1939 Anhai, China
- Died: 18 September 2022 (aged 82) Sanming, China
- Party: CCP
- Education: Fujian Normal University
- Occupation: Mycologist

Huang Nianlai (Chinese: 黄年来; November 1939 – 18 September 2022) was a Chinese mycologist and politician. A member of the Chinese Communist Party, he served in the National People's Congress from 1983 to 1993.

Huang died in Sanming on 18 September 2022, at the age of 82.
