= Yu Songlie =

Chinese agricultural scientist (1921–2016)

- 余松烈
- Born: 13 March 1921; Cixi, Zhejiang, China
- Died: 20 April 2016 (aged 95); Tai'an, Shandong, China
- Education: Fukien Christian University
- Scientific career
- Fields: agricultural science

Yu Songlie (Chinese: 余松烈; pinyin: Yú Sōngliè; 13 March 1921 – 20 April 2016) was a Chinese agricultural scientist, educator and an academician of the Chinese Academy of Engineering (CAE). He is known as one of the founders of wheat cultivation science in China.

== Biography ==
Yu was born in Cixi County, Zhejiang. He obtained a bachelor's degree of agronomy from Fukien Christian University in 1942. He became a teaching assistant in Fukien Provincial Agriculture College, Fukien Christian University and Shanghai Nantong College after his graduation. He was enrolled in Shandong Agriculture College in 1949 when the Chinese Communist Party took control of mainland China. On 4 December 1997, Yu was elected an academician of the Chinese Academy of Engineering for his achievements in wheat cultivation science.

Yu died on 20 April 2016 at the age of 95 in Tai'an.
