= Chemical elements in East Asian languages =

The names for chemical elements in East Asian languages, along with those for some chemical compounds (mostly organic), are among the newest words to enter the local vocabularies. Except for those metals well-known since antiquity, the names of most elements were created after modern chemistry was introduced to East Asia in the 18th and 19th centuries, with more translations being coined for those elements discovered later.

While most East Asian languages use—or have used—the Chinese script, only the Chinese language uses logograms as the predominant way of naming elements. Native phonetic writing systems are primarily used for element names in Japanese (Katakana), Korean (Hangul) and Vietnamese (chữ Quốc ngữ).

== Chinese ==
In Chinese, characters for the elements are the last officially created and recognized characters in the Chinese writing system. Unlike characters for unofficial varieties of Chinese (e.g., written Cantonese) or other now-defunct ad hoc characters (e.g., those by the Empress Wu), the names for the elements are official, consistent, and taught (with Mandarin pronunciation) to every Chinese and Taiwanese student who has attended public schools (usually by the first year of middle school). New names and symbols are decided upon by the China National Committee for Terminology in Science and Technology.

=== Native characters ===
Some metallic elements were already familiar to the Chinese, as their ores were already excavated and used extensively in China for construction, alchemy, and medicine. These include the long-established group of "Five Metals" (五金) — gold (金), silver (銀/银), copper (銅/铜), iron (鐵/铁), and tin (錫/锡) — as well as lead (鉛/铅) and mercury (汞).

Some non-metals were already named in Chinese as well, because their minerals were in widespread use. For example,

- boron (硼) as part of borax
- carbon (碳) in the form of charcoal
- sulfur (硫) had been used to make gunpowder since at least the 10th century in China.

=== Characters based on European pronunciations ===
However, the Chinese did not know about most of the elements until they were isolated during the Industrial Age. These new elements therefore required new characters, which were invented using the phono-semantic principle. Each character consists of two parts, one to signify the meaning and the other to hint at the sound:

The semantic (meaning) part is also the radical of the character. It refers to the element's usual state at room temperature and standard pressure. Only four radicals are used for elements: 釒/钅 (jīn "gold; metal") for solid metals, 石 (shí "stone, rock") for solid non-metals, 水/氵 (shuǐ "water") for liquids, and 气 (qì "gas, air") for gases.

The phonetic (sound) part represents the character's pronunciation and is a partial transliteration of the element's name. For each element character, this is a unique phonetic component. Since 118 elements have been discovered, over 100 phonetic components are used in naming the elements. Because many characters in modern Chinese are homophones, including for tone, two different phonetic components can be pronounced the same. Current practice dictates that new names should avoid being homophonous with previous element names or with organic functional groups. However, this rule was not rigorously followed in the past, and confusingly, the names of tin (锡) and selenium (硒) both have the pronunciation xī with the same tone. The alternative pronunciation xí for tin is recommended by the National Committee for Approval of Terms in Science and Technology (全国科学技术名词审定委员会).

锡 (tin) and 硒 (selenium) are not homophones in Nanjing Mandarin, which was the prestige dialect of Chinese when most elements were named, which was until the late 19th century. The phonetic component of 锡, 易 (yì), was accurate when the character was invented around 3000 years ago, but not now because of sound change. In Middle Chinese 锡 was an entering tone character, a closed syllable ending in -p/-t/-k (or -ʔ in some modern dialects). But 硒 was constructed in the late 19th century using the (still accurate) phonetic 西 (xī), which in Middle Chinese was a level tone character, an open syllable with a vowel ending. In Beijing Mandarin, the variety on which Standard Modern Chinese is based, stop consonant endings of syllables were dropped, and the entering tone was merged into the other tones in a complex and irregular manner by the 16th–17th centuries, and 锡 and 西 both became Tone 1 (high tone) characters. In dialects that preserve the entering tone, like Nanjing Mandarin and Shanghainese and Cantonese, 锡 retains a -k or -ʔ ending and 锡 and 西 (硒) are pronounced differently.

This sometimes causes difficulty in verbal communication, as Sn and Se can both be divalent and tetravalent. Thus, SnO_{2} 二氧化锡 and SeO_{2} 二氧化硒 would be pronounced identically, as èryǎnghuàxī, if not for the variant xí for 锡. To avoid further confusion, P.R.C. authorities avoided using the name 矽 xī (or any tonal variants) for silicon. (In Taiwan 矽 is pronounced xì.)

Examples of characters derived from European pronunciations
Semantic	Phonetic	Element	Source
釒/钅 +	里 lǐ	= 鋰/锂 (lǐ)	lithium
釒/钅 +	甲 jiǎ	= 鉀/钾 (jiǎ)	kalium, Latin name for potassium
釒/钅 +	內/内 nèi or nà ^{†}	= 鈉/钠 (nà)	natrium, Latin name for sodium
釒/钅 +	弟 dì or tì ^{†}	= 銻/锑 (Taiwan tì / Mainland tī*)	stibium, Latin name for antimony
釒/钅 +	臬 niè	= 鎳/镍 (niè)	nickel
釒/钅 +	鬲 gé	= 鎘/镉 (gé)	cadmium
釒/钅 +	烏/乌 wū	= 鎢/钨 (wū)	wolframium, Latin name for tungsten
釒/钅 +	必 bì	= 鉍/铋 (bì)	bismuth
釒/钅 +	由 yóu	= 鈾/铀 (Taiwan yòu* / Mainland yóu)	uranium
釒/钅 +	呂/吕 lǚ	= 鋁/铝 (lǚ)	aluminium
石 +	典 diǎn	= 碘 (diǎn)	iodine
气 +	亥 hài	= 氦 (hài)	helium
气 +	弗 fú	= 氟 (fú)	fluorine
气 +	乃 nǎi	= 氖 (nǎi)	neon
石 +	夕 xī	= 矽 (Taiwan xì* / Mainland xī)	silicon. Mainly used in R.O.C. (Taiwan), Hong Kong, and Macau
石 +	圭 guī	= 硅 (guī)	silicon. Derived from Japanese transliteration '珪' (kei, けい) of archaic Dutch keiaarde. Mostly used in P.R.C.

† 內/内 is primarily pronounced as nèi, but less commonly as nà, the source of 納/纳. Likewise, the primary pronunciation of 弟 is dì, but the alternate reading of tì gave rise to 銻/锑.

* The derived pronunciation differs (in tone or in sound) from the pronunciation of the element.

The "water" radical (水) is not used much here, as only two elements (bromine and mercury) are truly liquid at standard room temperature and pressure. Their characters are not based on the European pronunciation of the elements' names. Bromine (溴), the only liquid nonmetal at room temperature, is explained in the following section. Mercury (汞), now grouped with the heavy metals, was long classified as a kind of fluid in ancient China.

=== Meaning-based characters ===
A few characters, though, are not created using the above "phono-semantic" design, but are "semantic-semantic", that is, both of its parts indicate meanings. One part refers to the element's usual state (like the semanto-phonetic characters), while the other part indicates some additional property or function of the element. In addition, the second part also indicates the pronunciation of the element. Such elements are:

Semantic	Semantic	Element	English	Note
釒/钅 +	白 bái (white)	= 鉑/铂 bó (Note: The pronunciation of these characters come from the second semantic characters' nearly obsolete pronunciations. Nowadays 白 (white) is normally pronounced bái in the standard Mandarin dialect, although traditionally bó was preferred. Similarly, 臭 (stinky) is almost always pronounced chòu, as opposed to xiù, now an archaic reading.)	platinum	The character is repurposed. (Note: The original meaning of 鉑/铂 is "thin sheet of gold" (now obsolete). The character was not associated with platinum until modern time, since platinum was known in the Old World only after the Age of Discovery.)
氵 +	臭 chòu (stinky)	= 溴 xiù	bromine	odorous (Greek βρῶμος brómos also means 'stench')
气 +	羊 yáng, short for 養/养 yǎng (to nourish/foster)	= 氧 yǎng (Note: The apparent mismatch in pronunciation with the phonetic component is because the pronunciation is inherited from another character that provides the meaning. For example, the ultimate source of the pronunciation of 氧 yǎng (oxygen) is not 羊 yáng (sheep), but 養/养 yǎng (to nourish/foster).)	oxygen	A continuous supply of oxygenated air nourishes almost all animals
气 +	巠/𢀖 jīng, short for 輕/轻 qīng (light-weight)	= 氫/氢 qīng	hydrogen	the lightest of all elements
气 +	彔/录 lù, short for 綠/绿 lǜ (green)	= 氯/氯 lǜ	chlorine	greenish yellow in color
气 +	炎 yán, short for 淡 dàn (diluted)	= 氮 dàn	nitrogen	dilutes breathable air
石 +	粦 lín, short for 燐 lín (glow)	= 磷 lín	phosphorus	emits a faint glow in the dark

=== Usage in the nomenclature for simple inorganic compounds ===
Simple covalent binary inorganic compounds E_{m}X_{n} are named as

n X 化 (huà) m E (with n and m written as Chinese numerals),

where X is more electronegative than E, using the IUPAC formal electronegativity order. 化 as a full noun or verb means 'change; transform(ation)'. As a noun suffix, it is equivalent to the English suffixes -ized/-ated/-ified. It is the root of the word 化学 (huàxué) 'chemistry'.

For example, P_{4}S_{10} is called 十硫化四磷 (shíliúhuàsìlín) (literally: 'ten sulfur of four phosphorus', 'decasulfide of tetraphosphorus'). As in English nomenclature, if m = 1, the numerical prefix of E is usually dropped in covalent compounds. For example, CO is called 一氧化碳 (yīyǎnghuàtàn) (literally: 'one oxygen of carbon', 'monoxide of carbon').

However, for compounds named as salts, numerical prefixes are dropped altogether, as in English. Thus, calcium chloride, CaCl_{2}, is named 氯化钙 (literally: 'chloride of calcium'). The Chinese name for FeCl_{3}, 氯化铁, literally means 'chlorinated iron' and is akin to the archaic English names 'muriated iron' or 'muriate of iron'. In this example, 氯 is 'chlorine' and 铁 is 'iron'.

There is a Chinese analog of the -ic/-ous nomenclature for higher/lower oxidation states: -ous is translated as 亚 (yà, 'minor; secondary'): for example, FeCl_{2} is 氯化亚铁 and FeCl_{3} is 氯化铁. In a four-way contrast, hypo- is translated as 次 (cì, 'inferior; following') and per- is translated as 高 (gāo, 'high, upper'). For example, the acid HClO is 次氯酸 "inferior chlorine acid", HClO_{2} is 亚氯酸, HClO_{3} is 氯酸, and HClO_{4} is 高氯酸. In this example, the character 酸 (suān, 'sour') means (organic or inorganic) acid. The more modern Stock nomenclature in which oxidation state is explicitly specified can also be used: thus, tin(IV) oxide (SnO_{2}) is simply 氧化锡(IV).

=== Recently discovered elements ===
In 2015, IUPAC recognised the discovery of four new elements. In November 2016, IUPAC published their formal names and symbols: nihonium (_{113}Nh), moscovium (_{115}Mc), tennessine (_{117}Ts), and oganesson (_{118}Og).

Subsequently, in January 2017, the China National Committee for Terms in Sciences and Technologies published four naming characters for these elements. The National Academy for Educational Research under the Ministry of Education of the Republic of China on Taiwan published an almost identical list (the only differences being the use of the traditional Chinese metal radical '釒' in place of the simplified Chinese form '钅' for nihonium and moscovium) in April 2017.

For traditional Chinese, nihonium and moscovium were then existing characters; while in simplified Chinese, only moscovium already existed in the Unicode Standard. The missing characters were added to Unicode version 11.0 as urgently needed characters in June 2018. More generally, the characters for the transuranic elements are registered unevenly across Unicode blocks. The elements named before the 1990s are in the Basic Multilingual Plane, but many of the 1964-2000s elements were encoded on the Supplementary Ideographic Plane, mainly in CJK Unified Ideographs Extension E.

The Chinese characters for these symbols are:

- Nihonium: Traditional: U+9268 鉨 CJK UNIFIED IDEOGRAPH-9268 Simplified: U+9FED 鿭 CJK UNIFIED IDEOGRAPH-9FED (nǐ)
- Moscovium: Traditional: U+93CC 鏌 CJK UNIFIED IDEOGRAPH-93CC Simplified: U+9546 镆 CJK UNIFIED IDEOGRAPH-9546 (mò)
- Tennessine: Both Traditional and Simplified: U+9FEC 鿬 CJK UNIFIED IDEOGRAPH-9FEC (tián)
- Oganesson: Both Traditional and Simplified: U+9FEB 鿫 CJK UNIFIED IDEOGRAPH-9FEB (ào)

=== In the periodic table ===
Names of the chemical elements in Simplified Chinese

	1	2		3	4	5	6	7	8	9	10	11	12	13	14	15	16	17	18
1	氢 qīnghydrogen (Note: There are Chinese names for the isotopes of hydrogen. Protium is called 氕, deuterium is called 氘, and tritium is called 氚.)																		氦 hàihelium
2	锂 lǐlithium	铍 píberyllium												硼 péngboron	碳 tàncarbon	氮 dànnitrogen	氧 yǎngoxygen	氟 fúfluorine	氖 nǎineon
3	钠 nàsodium	镁 měimagnesium												铝 lǚaluminium	硅 guīsilicon	磷 línphosphorus	硫 liúsulfur	氯 lǜchlorine	氩 yàargon
4	钾 jiǎpotassium	钙 gàicalcium		钪 kàngscandium	钛 tàititanium	钒 fánvanadium	铬 gèchromium	锰 měngmanganese	铁 tiěiron	钴 gǔcobalt	镍 niènickel	铜 tóngcopper	锌 xīnzinc	镓 jiāgallium	锗 zhěgermanium	砷 shēnarsenic	硒 xīselenium	溴 xiùbromine	氪 kèkrypton
5	铷 rúrubidium	锶 sīstrontium		钇 yǐyttrium	锆 gàozirconium	铌 níniobium	钼 mùmolybdenum	锝 détechnetium	钌 liǎoruthenium	铑 lǎorhodium	钯 bǎpalladium	银 yínsilver	镉 gécadmium	铟 yīnindium	锡 xītin (Note: The reading xí (removing the homophony with selenium) can also be encountered.)	锑 tīantimony	碲 dìtellurium	碘 diǎniodine	氙 xiānxenon
6	铯 sècaesium	钡 bèibarium	1 asterisk	镥 lǔlutetium	铪 hāhafnium	钽 tǎntantalum	钨 wūtungsten	铼 láirhenium	锇 éosmium	铱 yīiridium	铂 bóplatinum	金 jīngold	汞 gǒngmercury	铊 tāthallium	铅 qiānlead	铋 bìbismuth	钋 pōpolonium	砹 àiastatine	氡 dōngradon
7	钫 fāngfrancium	镭 léiradium	1 asterisk	铹 láolawrencium	𬬻 lúrutherfordium	𬭊 dùdubnium	𬭳 xǐseaborgium	𬭛 bōbohrium	𬭶 hēihassium	鿏 màimeitnerium	𫟼 dádarmstadtium	𬬭 lúnroentgenium	鿔 gēcopernicium	鿭 nǐnihonium	𫓧 fūflerovium	镆 mòmoscovium	𫟷 lìlivermorium	鿬 tiántennessine	鿫 àooganesson
1 asterisk				镧 lánlanthanum	铈 shìcerium	镨 pǔpraseodymium	钕 nǚneodymium	钷 pǒpromethium	钐 shānsamarium	铕 yǒueuropium	钆 gágadolinium	铽 tèterbium	镝 dīdysprosium	钬 huǒholmium	铒 ěrerbium	铥 diūthulium	镱 yìytterbium
1 asterisk				锕 āactinium	钍 tǔthorium	镤 púprotactinium	铀 yóuuranium	镎 náneptunium	钚 bùplutonium	镅 méiamericium	锔 júcurium	锫 péiberkelium	锎 kāicalifornium	锿 āieinsteinium	镄 fèifermium	钔 ménmendelevium	锘 nuònobelium

Primordial From decay Synthetic Border shows natural occurrence of the element

Pronunciations for some elements differ between mainland China and Taiwan, as described in the article. Simplified characters and mainland Chinese pronunciations are shown above. Some of the characters for the superheavy elements may not be visible depending on fonts.

=== Notes ===
Comparison of mainland China, Taiwan and SAR names
English	Z	Mainland China	Taiwan	Hong Kong/Macau
silicon	14	硅 guī	矽 xì	硅 gwai^{1}, 矽 zik^{6}
technetium	43	锝 dé	鎝 tǎ	鎝 daap^{1}, 鍀 dak^{1}
lutetium	71	镥 lǔ	鎦 liú	鑥 lou^{5}, 鎦 lau^{4}
astatine	85	砹 ài	砈 è	砹 ngaai^{6}, 砈 ngo^{5}
francium	87	钫 fāng	鍅 fǎ	鈁 fong^{1}, 鍅 faat^{3}
neptunium	93	镎 ná	錼 nài	錼 noi^{6}, 鎿 naa^{4}
plutonium	94	钚 bù	鈽 bù	鈈 bat^{1}
americium	95	镅 méi	鋂 méi	鎇 mei^{4}, 鋂 mui^{4}
berkelium	97	锫 péi	鉳 běi	錇 pui^{4}, 鉳 bak^{1}
californium	98	锎 kāi	鉲 kǎ	鐦 hoi^{1}, 鉲 kaa^{1}
einsteinium	99	锿 āi	鑀 ài	鎄 oi^{1}, 鑀 oi^{3}

A minority of the "new characters" are not completely new inventions, as they coincide with archaic characters, whose original meanings have long been lost to most people. For example, 鈹 (beryllium), 鉻 (chromium), 鑭 (lanthanum), and 鏷 (protactinium), are obscure characters meaning "needle", "hook", "harrow", and "raw iron", respectively.

Some elements' names were already present as characters used in the names of members of the House of Zhu. In the early Ming dynasty, the Hongwu Emperor established a rule that his descendants' given names must follow the order of the Five Phases per generation, and should have a character including the radical for one of the Five Phases. Some later descendants had to adopt rarely used characters, and even created new characters to fit this rule, which were later readopted for chemical elements. For example,

- radium (鐳/镭) from Zhu Shenlei (朱慎鐳, 1572–1598), Prince Yonghe Gongyi
- polonium (釙/钋) from Zhu Zhengpo (朱徵釙, 1440–1469), Prince Hanhui
- cerium (鈰/铈) from Zhu Enshi (朱恩鈰, 1460–1497), Prince Yuanling Xuanmu.

Most element names are the same in Simplified and Traditional Chinese, merely being variants of each other, since most of the names were translated by a single body of standardization before the PRC-ROC split. However, elements discovered close to, during, or after the split sometimes have different names in Taiwan and in mainland China. In Hong Kong, both Taiwanese and mainland Chinese names are used. A few pronunciations also differ even when the characters are analogous: cobalt gǔ (PRC) / gū (ROC); palladium bǎ (PRC) / bā (ROC); tin xī (PRC) / xí (ROC); antimony tī (PRC) / tì (ROC); polonium pō (PRC) / pò (ROC); uranium yóu (PRC) / yòu (ROC); bohrium bō (PRC) / pō (ROC).

The isotopes of hydrogen – protium (^{1}H), deuterium (D) and tritium (T) – are written 氕 piē, 氘 dāo and 氚 chuān, respectively, in both simplified and traditional writing. 鑀 is used in Taiwan for both einsteinium (mainland China: 锿) and ionium, a previous name for the isotope thorium-230.

=== History ===
In 1871, John Fryer and Shou Xu proposed the modern convention of exclusively using single characters for element names.

== Japanese ==
Like other words in the language, elements' names in Japanese can be native (yamatokotoba), from China (Sino-Japanese) or from Europe (gairaigo).

=== Names based on European pronunciations ===
Even though the Japanese language also uses Chinese characters (kanji), it primarily employs katakana to transliterate names of the elements from European languages (often German/Dutch or Latin [via German] or English). Elements not listed in any of the tables below have their names follow English, like tungsten.

English	Japanese	Note
tungsten	tangusuten (タングステン)	from English; other major European languages refer to this element as wolfram or tungsten with some additional syllable (-o, -e, etc.).
nihonium	nihoniumu (ニホニウム)	The first element discovered in Japan. Named after Japan (Nihon).
sodium	natoriumu (ナトリウム)	natrium in Latin
potassium	kariumu (カリウム)	kalium in Latin
titanium	chitan (チタン)	Titan in German
chromium	kuromu (クロム)	Chrom in German
manganese	mangan (マンガン)	Mangan in German. Formerly written with ateji as 満俺.
selenium	seren (セレン)	Selen in German
niobium	niobu (ニオブ)	Niob in German
molybdenum	moribuden (モリブデン)	Molybdän in German
antimony	anchimon (アンチモン)	From either Dutch antimoon or German Antimon
tellurium	teruru (テルル)	Tellur in German
lanthanum	rantan (ランタン)	Lanthan in German
praseodymium	puraseojimu (プラセオジム)	Praseodym in German
neodymium	neojimu (ネオジム)	Neodym in German
tantalum	tantaru (タンタル)	Tantal in German
uranium	uran (ウラン)	Uran in German
fluorine	fusso (弗素)	futsu (弗) approximates flu-. Similar to the Chinese: 氟, plus the "air" radical (气). As 弗 is not a commonly used kanji, it is often written フッ素, using katakana.
iodine	yōso (ヨウ素 / 沃素)	yō- (ヨウ; "io-" [joː], like Dutch jood [joːt]) or German Jod + -so (素; "element/component"). Chinese uses 碘 (diǎn), the second syllable of iodine.

=== Native names ===
On the other hand, elements known since antiquity are Chinese loanwords, which are mostly identical to their Chinese counterparts, albeit in the Shinjitai, for example, iron (鉄) is tetsu (Tang-dynasty loan) and lead (鉛) is namari (native reading). While all elements in Chinese are single-character in the official system, some Japanese elements have two characters. Often this parallels colloquial or everyday names for such elements in Chinese, such as 水銀/水银 (pinyin: shuǐyín) for mercury and 硫黃/硫黄 (pinyin: liúhuáng) for sulfur. A special case is tin (錫, suzu), which is more often written in katakana (スズ).

English	Japanese	Chinese	Note
mercury	suigin (水銀)	汞 (gǒng)	lit. "watery silver" aka. quicksilver, like the element's symbol, Hg (Latin/Greek hydro-argyrum, "water-silver"). In the Greater China Region, 水銀/水银 is more generally used than 汞, because 汞 is not taught until the chemistry class (or physics class as in "汞液柱" while teaching atmospheric pressure) but 水銀/水银 is the word used in daily life; for example, when people talk about the mercury liquid in the thermometer, most people would say "水銀/水银" but not 汞. This kind of thermometer is called "水銀溫度計/水银温度计" (lit. "watery silver thermometer") in Chinese instead of "汞溫度計/汞温度计" (lit. "mercury thermometer"), which is not used at all. In Japanese too, 汞 kō exists but is very rare and literary, having an alternative obsolete reading mizugane. It is used in 昇汞 shōkō "mercuric chloride" (which also exists in Chinese as shēnggǒng).
sulfur	iō, formerly iwō (硫黄)	硫 (liú)	黄 (ō) means "yellow", to distinguish 硫 from other characters pronounced the same.
zinc	aen (亜鉛)	鋅/锌 (xīn)	meaning "light lead"; 鉛 is "lead" in Japanese and Chinese.
platinum	hakkin (白金)	鉑 (bó)	lit. "white gold". Like 水銀/水银 and 汞 in Chinese, 白金 is the "daily"/colloquial word, and 鉑/铂 is the formal name and usually won't be taught until the chemistry class. In mainland China, jewelry stores usually use the word "白金" or "铂金".
arsenic	hiso (砒素)	砷 (shēn)	hi (ヒ) < (砒霜) hi-shimo, the Chinese name for arsenic trioxide (pīshuāng). In modern Chinese, arsenic is instead shēn (砷), an approximation of the second syllable of arsenic. The kanji 砒 is quite rare. Often written ヒ素 using katakana.
boron	hōso (硼素; "borax element")	硼 (péng)	Hō (ホウ) < hōsa (硼砂), the Chinese name for borax (péngshā). Boron is still called péng in modern Chinese. The kanji 硼 is extremely rare. Mostly written ホウ素 using katakana.

=== Meaning-based names ===
Some names were later invented to describe properties or characteristics of the element. They were mostly introduced around the 18th century to Japan, and they sometimes differ drastically from their Chinese counterparts. The following comparison shows that Japanese does not use the radical system for naming elements like Chinese.

English	Japanese	Chinese	Note
hydrogen	suiso (水素; "water's element")	氫/氢 (qīng)	translation of the hydro- prefix, or translation of the Dutch word for hydrogen, waterstof ("Water substance"), or the German word Wasserstoff
carbon	tanso (炭素; "coal element")	碳 (tàn)	translation of the Dutch word for carbon, koolstof ("coal substance").
nitrogen	chisso (窒素; "the suffocating element")	氮 (dàn)	translation of the Dutch word for nitrogen, stikstof ("suffocating substance"). While nitrogen is not toxic per se and in fact constitutes the majority of air, air-breathing animals cannot survive breathing it alone (without sufficient oxygen mixed in).
oxygen	sanso (酸素; "acid's element")	氧 (yǎng)	similar to the Dutch word for oxygen, zuurstof ("sour substance"), the German word Sauerstoff or the Greek-based oxygen ("acid maker"). Many 19th-century European chemists erroneously believed that all acids contain oxygen. (Many common ones do—called oxyacid, but not all—the ones that are called hydracid.)
silicon	keiso (硅素 / 珪素)	硅 (guī)	same as Chinese; the kanji 硅 is extremely rare. Often written ケイ素 using katakana. Its origin lies in the Dutch word keiaarde; kei is a partial calque. The Chinese word is an orthographic borrowing from Japanese.
phosphorus	rin (燐)	磷 (lín)	similar to Chinese, except the "fire" radical replacing the "stone" radical. The kanji 燐 is rare. Usually written リン using katakana.
chlorine	enso (塩素; "salt's element")	氯 (lǜ)	together with sodium make up common table salt (NaCl); 塩 is the Shinjitai version of 鹽.
bromine	shūso (臭素; "the stinky element")	溴 (xiù)	similar to Chinese, except the lack of the "water" radical.

== Korean ==
As Hanja (Sino-Korean characters) are now rarely used in Korea, all of the elements are written in Hangul. Since many Korean scientific terms were translated from Japanese sources, the pattern of naming is mostly similar to that of Japanese. Namely, the classical elements are loanwords from Chinese, with new elements from European languages. But recently, some elements' names were changed. For example:

English	Korean (before 2014)	Source	(South) Korean (after 2014)
gold	geum (금)	from Chinese jin (金)	geum (금)
silver	eun (은)	from Chinese yin (銀)	eun (은)
antimony	antimon (안티몬)	from German	antimoni (안티모니)
tungsten	teongseuten (텅스텐)	from English	teongseuten (텅스텐)
sodium	nateuryum (나트륨)	from Latin or German (Na for natrium)	sodyum (소듐)
potassium	kallyum (칼륨)	from Latin or German kalium	potasyum (포타슘)
manganese	manggan (망간)	from German Mangan	mangganijeu (망가니즈)

Pre-modern (18th-century) elements often are the Korean pronunciation of their Japanese equivalents, e.g.,

English	Korean (Hangul, hanja)
hydrogen	suso (수소, 水素)
carbon	tanso (탄소, 炭素)
nitrogen	jilso (질소, 窒素)
oxygen	sanso (산소, 酸素)
chlorine	yeomso (염소, 鹽素)
zinc	ayeon (아연, 亞鉛)
mercury	sueun (수은, 水銀)

== Vietnamese ==
In Vietnamese, some of the elements known since antiquity and medieval times are loanwords from Chinese, such as copper (đồng from 銅), tin (thiếc from 錫), mercury (thuỷ ngân from 水銀), sulfur (lưu huỳnh from 硫黃), oxygen (dưỡng khí from 氧氣; oxi or oxy is the more common name) and platinum (bạch kim from 白金; platin is another common name). Others have native or old Sino-Vietnamese names, such as sắt for iron, bạc for silver, chì for lead, vàng for gold, kền for nickel (niken or nickel are the more common names) and kẽm for zinc. In either case, now they are written in the Vietnamese alphabet. Before the Latin alphabet was introduced, sắt was rendered as 𨫊, bạc as 鉑, chì as 𨨲, vàng as 鐄, kền as 𨪝 and kẽm as 𨯘 in Chữ Nôm.

The majority of elements are shortened and localized pronunciations of the European names (usually from French). For example:

- Phosphorus becomes phốtpho and phosphor.
- The -ine suffix is absent, e.g., chlorine, iodine and fluorine become clo, iốt (or iod) and flo, respectively; compare French chlore, iode, fluor.
- The -um suffix is lost, e.g., caesium becomes xêzi (or caesi), pronounced /sezi/; compare the French césium, pronounced /sezjɔm/ (whereas the English is /sizi-/).
  - Similarly, beryllium, tellurium, lithium, natrium (sodium), and lanthanum become berili, telua, liti, natri, and lantan respectively
- The -gen suffix is lost, e.g., nitrogen, oxygen and hydrogen become nitơ, ôxy and hiđrô, respectively

A minority of elements, mostly those not suffixed with -ium, retain their full name, e.g.,

- Tungsten (aka wolfram) becomes volfram.
- Bismuth becomes bitmut.
- Aluminium becomes nhôm (銋), because the ending -nium has a similar pronunciation. It was the first element to be known in English in Vietnam.
- Elements with the -on suffix (e.g. noble gases) seem to be inconsistent. Boron and silicon are respectively shortened to bo and silic. On the other hand, neon, argon, krypton, xenon and radon do not have common shorter forms.
- Unlike the other halogens, astatine retains its suffix (astatin in Vietnamese).
- Antimony is shortened to antimon, and arsenic to asen; these names are similar to the German ones (Antimon and Arsen, respectively).

Some elements have multiple names, for instance, potassium is known as pô-tát and kali (from kalium, the element's Latin name).

Update in 2018 General Education Program, chemistry section: (At page 50)

- Integration principles: Chemical nomenclature is used according to recommendations of the International Union of Pure and Applied Chemistry (IUPAC) with reference to Vietnamese Standards (TCVN 5529:2010 and 5530:2010 of the Directorate for Standards, Metrology and Quality, Decision No. 2950-QD/BKHCN of the Ministry of Science and Technology), consistent with Vietnamese practice, gradually meeting the requirements of unification and integration.
- Practical principles: Use the names of 13 elements commonly used in Vietnamese: gold, silver, copper, lead, iron, aluminum, zinc, sulfur, tin, nitrogen, sodium, potassium and mercury; At the same time, there are English terms for easy reference. Compounds of these elements are named according to IUPAC recommendations

== See also ==
- Discoveries of the chemical elements
- Organic nomenclature in Chinese
