= Zhu Wenxiang =

- 朱文祥

Deputy Commander of the People's Armed Police Force
- Incumbent
- Assumed office July 2020
- Commander: Wang Ning→Wang Chunning

Personal details
- Born: December 1963 (age 62) Xingguo County, Jiangxi, China
- Party: Chinese Communist Party
- Education: Fujian Normal University

Military service
- Allegiance: People's Republic of China
- Branch/service: People's Armed Police Force
- Rank: Lieutenant general

Zhu Wenxiang (Chinese: 朱文祥; pinyin: Zhū Wénxiáng; born December 1963) is a lieutenant general in the People's Armed Police Force of China.

He is a representative of the 20th National Congress of the Chinese Communist Party and an alternate of the 20th Central Committee of the Chinese Communist Party.

== Biography ==
Zhu was born in Xingguo County, Jiangxi, in December 1963. He attended Pingchuan High School and graduated from Fujian Normal University. He served in the Fujian Armed Police Corps for a long time.

He was elevated to commander of the Henan Armed Police Corps in July 2014. In May 2016, he was appointed commander of the Sichuan Armed Police Corps, succeeding Tang Dazhun. He was made president of the People's Armed Police Force Command Academy in September 2017, and one year later became commander of the First Mobile Corps of the People's Armed Police Force. He rose to become deputy commander of the People's Armed Police Force in July 2020.

He was promoted to the rank of major general (shaojiang) in July 2015 and lieutenant general (zhongjiang) in July 2020.
