= Fujian Normal University =

University in China

- 福建师范大学
- Other name: Fúshīdà (福师大)
- Motto: 知明行笃 立诚致广
- Type: Public
- Established: 1907; 119 years ago
- President: Zheng Jiajian
- Faculty: 1,232
- Undergraduates: 30,000
- Postgraduates: 2,700
- Location: Fuzhou, Fujian, China; 26°02′24.11″N 119°18′19.85″E
- Campus: Urban, 213 ha (530 acres)
- Website: www.fjnu.edu.cn

Fujian Normal University (Chinese: 福建师范大学) is a public university in Fuzhou, China. FNU has been hailed as the Fujian province's "cradle of teachers."

== History ==
Tracing its origin back to Fujian Superior Normal School, founded in 1907, Fujian Normal University (FNU) is Fujian's oldest university and one of China's most time-honored teachers' colleges. After the founding of the People's Republic of China, the school (which had been renamed Fujian Provincial Normal College) merged in 1953 with Fukian (Note: "Fukian" is an obsolete romanization of Fujian) Christian University and Hua Nan Women's College to form a new and significantly expanded Fujian Normal College. The Fukian Christian University was founded by the Church Missionary Society in the Fukian Mission where Constance Bryant was the administrator. FNU acquired its current name in 1972.

== Colleges and schools ==
- School of Education
- School of Economics
- School of Liberal Arts
- School of Communication
- School of Social History
- School of Law
- School of Public Administration
- School of Foreign Language
- School of Music
- School of Fine Arts
- School of Physical Science
- School of Mathematics and Computer Science
- Faculty of Software
- School of Physics and Electronics Technology
- School of Environmental Science and Engineering
- School of Life Science
- School of Geographical Science
- Minnan Institute of Technology (Fuqing Campus)
- Concord University College

== Notable alumni ==
- Cai Qi, politician
- George Chen, professor and inventor
- Chen Jianwen, politician
- Fan Di'an, painter
- Guo Zurong, composer
- Huang Ko-Chuan, artist
- Huang Kunming, politician
- Huang Nianlai, mycologist and politician
- Huang Weiyuan, organic chemist
- Lin Lanying, materials scientist
- Song Tao, diplomat
- Tang Chongti, biologist and professor
- Wang Zhimin, politician
- Ye Chaoqun, para table tennis player
- Yu Songlie, agricultural scientist
- Zhang Hao, singer
- Zhu Wenxiang, lieutenant general in the People's Armed Police Force of China
