= Constance Bryant =

English Christian missionary (1887–1975)

- Born: June 22, 1887; Chatham, England
- Died: May 12, 1975 (aged 87); Christlehurst, Kent, England
- Education: Westfield College, University of London
- Occupation: Missionary
- Years active: 33 years

Constance Bryant (June 22, 1887–May 12, 1975) was an English missionary who served for the Fukien Mission under the Church Missionary Society (CMS). Bryant worked for over thirty years in East Asia. Her work led to founding the Fukien Christian University in 1916 that merged with the Fujian Superior Normal School and the Hua Nan Women's College to form today's Fujian Normal University.

== Early life and education ==
Constance Bryant was born to Alfred Charles Edward Bryant (1849-1895) and Eliza Weller (1850-1921) in Kent, England. She had three sisters. The family held residence in Chatham, Kent when she was born.

Bryant's educational training began at Christ's Hospital Girls' School of Hertford, England. Bryant then attended Westfield College from 1907 to 1911, an institution founded to educate women for the University of London. She graduated with Class 3 Honors in Modern European History - a major in the Faculty of Arts. In 1911, Bryant enrolled in the London Day Training School program of the University of London and passed the Examination of Pedagogy in 1912. She obtained her B.A. and became a Life Member of Convocation with the university.

== Career ==
On June 17, 1913, Bryant accepted her admission into the missionary program of the Church Missionary Society. She was sent on the Fukien Mission in the now Fujian Province of Southeast China. Directly before Bryant's arrival, the CMS established eleven dioceses across districts within Fukien (in 1912) to work in close unity with one another.

Bryant, one of the first female missionaries of the Fukien Mission to do so, assumed an administrated position as the designated liaison between the CMS correspondents in England and the mission in Fukien. Bryant wrote annual letters to England as an overview of the affairs with the Fukien Mission and was occasionally published in the Fukien News newspaper for her written articles about her experiences as a missionary. She expressed the hardships of running the mission hospitals and schools during World War II and the Japanese occupation in China.

In Bryant's 1938-1939 annual report, she highlights the shared anxieties of the World War crises in the West. In 1939, Bryant traveled throughout the Fukien province to the modern day capitol of Fuzhou, Lienkong, Dong Muong, and Gwang Tau to report on the work of the dioceses. Bryant reported that roads were torn up, ports were closed, and extensive destruction of diocese property and great life losses occurred. Military threats and dangerous conditions continued through the end of the second world war, and in addition to frequent bombings, Bryant worked through evacuations of the Fukien Normal School in which she worked, high inflation prices and undersupply of rice, a lack of available Christian teachers, and government pressure to raise qualifications for instructors at the Normal School. On October 6, 1941, Bryant's mission school was looted by Japanese occupiers, leaving the students and instructors without equipment and in dire need of money. In response, she developed a financial report, following the looting, for the Church Missionary Society. The report resulted in the shipment of resources to help maintain the hospitals and schools in Fukien.

== Death ==
Following her retirement from the Church Missionary Society in 1947, Bryant returned to her residence in Kent, England and died May 12, 1975.
