= Guo Zurong =

Chinese composer

- Born: December 16, 1928 (age 97)
- Origin: Fuzhou, Fujian Province, China
- Genres: Classical
- Occupations: Composer, teacher
- Instrument: Piano
- Years active: 1947–present

Guo Zurong (Chinese: 郭祖荣; born December 16, 1928) is a Chinese composer of classical music born and mainly based in Fuzhou, Fujian Province.

Guo Zurong composed his first work for violin and orchestra in 1947. He is largely self-taught in composition, although he was enrolled by Fujian Normal University in 1952 and studied music briefly in the university. He is regarded as the most prolific Chinese composer of symphonies, writing 33 symphonies composed between 1955 and 2019. He is also the composer of 9 piano concertos, 4 violin concertos, more than 6 piano sonatas, and over 100 songs.

He composed and taught in the Fuijan Art Academy, one student Guo had taught was the composer Wen Deqing.
