= Liu Max C.W. =

Taiwanese painter and anthropologist

Liu Chiwai (Chinese:劉其偉, August 25, 1912 – April 13, 2002), and also known as Liu Max C.W., was a Taiwanese painter and anthropologist known for his watercolor and mixed media works. He was known as the "Old Playful Soul of the art world (畫壇老頑童)" for his adventurous spirit in exploring Africa, Oceania, and Borneo and his passion for primitive art. He devoted his life to the study of art anthropology and the research of indigenous cultures, and published numerous related works to promote his love for nature and conservation of natural ecology.

== Life ==
=== 1910-1940 ===
Liu was born as Liu Fu-sheng (劉福盛) in Fuzhou, Fujian, China in 1912, but changed his name to Liu Chiwai at the age of 10. After the Great Kanto earthquake in 1923, he moved to Kobe, Japan. He graduated from the Kobe English Mission School in 1932 at the age of 18.

In 1932, Liu was awarded a scholarship for the Boxer Rebellion indemnity as a Chinese overseas student, and he studied at the Tokyo Railway Training Institute in the specialized electrical department. In 1935, he returned to China from Japan and worked at the Tianjin Cotton Mill (天津公大紗廠).

=== From 1940 to 1960 ===
In 1940, Liu entered the Technical Office of the Ministry of War in Taiwan (軍政部兵工署) as a technician and made multiple trips to Yunnan and Myanmar, which sparked his interest in anthropology. In 1945, he was transferred to the Resources Commission of the Ministry of Economy (經濟部資源委員會) as a technician and was sent to Taiwan in December for post-war recovery and restoration projects. In 1946, he became an engineer at the Badouzi Power Plant (八斗子發電廠) of the Taiwan Power Company, and later became the head of the Mechanical and Civil Engineering Section of the Taiwan Metal Mining Office (台灣金銅礦籌備處). In 1948, he was transferred to the Electric Power Division of the Taiwan Sugar Corporation and settled in Tingzhou Road (汀州路) in Taipei. After viewing the exhibition of painter Xiang Hong (香洪) at the Zhongshan Hall in Taipei in 1949, he began to study watercolor painting independently and created the first piece, "A Sleeping Child on a Tatami Mat (榻榻米上熟睡的小兒子)". At the same time, he began to translate art books.

In 1950, the watercolor painting "The Setting Sun in the Silent Hall (寂殿斜陽)" was selected for the 5th Provincial Art Exhibition in Taiwan (全省美展). The following April, he held his first solo exhibition at the Zhongshan Hall in Taipei. In May 1954, his first translated work, "Watercolor Painting Techniques", was published. In 1957, he was transferred to the United States Navy's air force base in Hsinchu, Taiwan, and the following year became an engineer at the Military Engineering Bureau of the Ministry of National Defense. In 1959, he and his artist friends founded the "United Watercolor Painting Association" (聯合水彩畫會, now the Watercolor Painting Association of R.O.C, 中國水彩畫會).

=== From 1960 to 1980 ===
In 1961, Liu founded the Eurasia Publishing Company (歐亞出版社), which specialized in publishing art books. In 1962, he compiled "Modern Painting Basic Theories (現代繪畫基本理論)." In 1964, he was appointed as a professor in the Art Department of the Political Work Cadres College (政工幹校, now "Fu Hsing Kang College, National Defense University"). In July 1965, he spent two years living in the Indochinese Peninsula, where he investigated the artistic civilization of the Champa and Angkor Wat, completed "A Page of History of the Indochinese Peninsula (中南半島一頁史)," and shifted his painting style towards primitive art, establishing his personal artistic style.

In 1967, he returned to Taiwan to work for the Ministry of National Defense's Military Industry Bureau, and in July of that year, he presented "Watercolors of the Vietnam War" at the National Museum of History. The following year, he transferred to the Design Division of the Logistics Engineering Command. In 1969, he won the fourth Sun Yat-sen Literature and Art Award for his creative work.

In 1971, Liu left his public post to establish an Art Academy (中國藝術學苑) with Read Lee. In 1972, he went to the Philippines to explore local art education, ancient painting remains, as well as research the indigenous cultures. In July of that year, he held a solo exhibition at the Hilton Manila, and the following year, he published "Primitive Culture and Art of the Philippine Islands (菲島原始文化與藝術)," which won the "Southeast Asian Art and Culture Creation" Honour Award from the National Commission for Culture and the Arts of the Philippines, and he was appointed as an Honorary Research Fellow at the Southeast Asian Cultural Studies Institute of Hong Kong.

In 1974, Liu taught at the Department of Architecture at Chung Yuan Christian University. In 1975, he served as a part-time professor in the Department of Architecture at Tamkang University. In 1976, he participated in the First Asian Artists' Conference in Seoul, South Korea, where he also researched ancient art and architecture on the Korean Peninsula. In 1977, he researched the culture of the Paiwan tribe in Pingtung County and surveyed the slate houses. In 1978, he traveled to Central and South America to visit the ancient civilizations of the Maya, Inca, as well as the other Indian cultures. In 1979, he held a watercolor solo exhibition at the UIC Hall in Singapore and visited the Atayal tribe in Hualien. The following year, he visited Orchid Island.

In 1980, he was appointed as a visiting professor in the Art Department of Ohio State University. From 1981, with the sponsorship of the Malaysia International Times and the Taiwan Handicraft Promotion Center (臺灣手工業中心), he traveled to Sarawak in Borneo to collect primitive art materials, including the rainforests of the Rajang River Basin and the Rako Wildlife Reserve. In 1984, he held five solo exhibitions and traveled to South Africa. In 1985, he visited the Lundayeh and Murut tribes in Sabah for interviews and research.

=== After 1990 ===
In 1993, at the age of 81, Liu led an expedition team to Papua New Guinea in Oceania to conduct research on stone artifacts. It was his last long-term exploration to remote areas.

In June 2000, his book "Adventures of a Old Playful soul - Liu Qiwei's Memoir in Images (老頑童歷險記─劉其偉影像回憶錄)" was published. In 2002, Liu died at the age of 90.
