= Tang Chongti =

Chinese biologist

- 唐崇惕
- Born: November 26, 1929 (age 95); Fuzhou, Fujian, China
- Occupation: Parasitologist

Tang Chongti (Chinese: 唐崇惕; born November 26, 1929) is a Chinese parasitologist and professor of Xiamen University. In 1991, she was elected as an academician of the Chinese Academy of Sciences. She is mainly engaged in research on pathogenic developmental biology, epidemiology, and prevention of zoonotic parasitic diseases.

== Life ==
Tang was born on November 26, 1929, in Fuzhou, Fujian, China. She entered Fujian Union College (now Fujian Normal University) in 1949 and graduated from the Biology Department in 1954 with a bachelor's degree. After graduation, she was assigned to teach at the Department of Biology in East China Normal University. Impacted by the Cultural Revolution, East China Normal University was suspended in 1970, and Tang was sent to work in Shajiang Commune, Xiapu County. In 1972, she was transferred to Xiamen University. Since 1980, she has served as the deputy director of the Parasitology Laboratory of Xiamen University. She was promoted to assistant professor in 1981, qualified as a doctoral thesis advisor in 1985, and promoted to full professor in 1986. In the same year she was promoted to full professor, Tang began research on hepatic hydatids. In 1991, she was elected as a member of the Chinese Science and Technology Committee of the Ministry of Education. In the same year, she was also elected as an academician of the Chinese Academy of Sciences. Since 1995, Tang has been the director of the Parasitology Laboratory of Xiamen University. In 2010, she began to serve as the director of the Academic Committee of the Key Laboratory of Animal Parasites in Gansu Province.

== Honors ==
In 1978, Tang was awarded the Science and Technology Achievement Award of the China Science Conference, and in 1980 she was awarded the Second Prize of Science and Technology by the Fujian Provincial People's Government. In 1982, 1988 and 1990, Tang won the third prize, third prize and fourth prize, respectively, of the State Natural Science Award. In 1986, Tang was awarded the title of "Young Expert with Outstanding Contributions." The following year, she was awarded the May 1st Medal of Fujian Province and the title of "March 8" Red Bannerman in Fujian Province. In 1988, she won the first prize of scientific and technological progress awarded by the State Education Commission. In 1995, she was awarded both the National "March 8" Red Bannerman title and the title of National Education System Model Worker. In 2001, she was awarded the title of National Teacher Ethics Outstanding Individual.
