= Chinese Chemical Letters =

- Discipline: Chemistry
- Language: English
- Edited by: Xu-Hong Qian

Publication details
- History: 1990-present
- Publisher: Elsevier on behalf of the Chinese Chemical Society (China)
- Frequency: Monthly
- Impact factor: 6.779 (2020)

Standard abbreviations
- ISO 4: Chin. Chem. Lett.

Indexing
- CODEN: CCLEE7
- ISSN: 1001-8417 (print); 1878-5964 (web)
- LCCN: 2004203000
- OCLC no.: 41953115

Links
- Journal homepage; Online archive; Journal page at society website

Chinese Chemical Letters is a monthly peer-reviewed scientific journal covering all aspects of chemistry. It was established in 1990 and is published by Elsevier on behalf of the Chinese Chemical Society. The editor-in-chief is Xu-Hong Qian (East China University of Science and Technology).

== Abstracting and indexing ==
The journal is abstracted and indexed in:

- Chemical Abstracts Service
- Science Citation Index Expanded
- Scopus

According to the Journal Citation Reports, the journal has a 2020 impact factor of 4.632. {cite web |url=https://www.journals.elsevier.com/chinese-chemical-letters}

== Coercive citations ==
In 2015, it was reported by Jeffrey Beall that the journal offered to waive their article processing charge for authors whose articles would be cited more than 6 times (apparently including self-citations) in the first two years after publication. This practice is known as coercive citation. In a reaction, the editorial office stated that this episode "was totally due to the inappropriate English expression of our newly joined editor" and that "[t]he publication fee waiver based on the citations has been eliminated."
