= Tsun-Peng Pao =

Chinese journalist and official (1916–1970)

Tsun-Peng Pao (1916–1970), also known by his courtesy name Longxi, was a journalist, writer and government official who served as the first director of the National Museum of History in the Republic of China.

== Early life and education ==
Pao was born on November 2, 1916, in Dingyuan County, Anhui Province, China. He graduated from Fudan University, National Chengchi University, and the Central School of Party Affairs. He also conducted research at the University of Pennsylvania in the United States

== Career ==
In late 1948, Pao moved to Taiwan and taught at several universities, including National Taiwan Normal University, Soochow University, Fu Jen Catholic University, and the Chinese Culture University. He was also involved in cultural and academic activities.

In 1955, Pao became the preparatory director of the National Museum of History and served as its director from 1956 to 1969. In 1968, he was appointed as the director of the National Central Library (now known as the National Library of Taiwan).Pao's scholarly work focused on the history and development of museums in China, as well as the preservation of cultural artifacts. Some of his notable writings include "A Draft History of Chinese Museums," "The Evolution and Development of Chinese Museums," "On Historical Museums," "The Preservation of Cultural Relics during Wartime," "The Law on the Protection of Cultural Relics," and "The Preservation of Outdoor Museums and Historic Sites."

== Death ==
During his time in public service, Pao's health deteriorated. He died on February 20, 1970, at the age of 55 at Tri-Service General Hospital in Taipei.
