= Carane =

Chemical compound

Names
- IUPAC name 3,7,7-trimethylbicyclo[4.1.0]heptane

Identifiers
CAS Number	554-59-6
3D model (JSmol)	Interactive image
ChEBI	CHEBI:35663
ChemSpider	71375
PubChem CID	79043
CompTox Dashboard (EPA)	DTXSID10858852
- InChI: InChI=1S/C10H18/c1-7-4-5-8-9(6-7)10(8,2)3/h7-9H,4-6H2,1-3H3
- SMILES: CC1CCC2C(C1)C2(C)C

Properties
Chemical formula	C_{10}H_{18}
Molar mass	138.254 g·mol^{−1}
Appearance	Solid
Density	0.8381 g/cm^{3}
Boiling point	156–166 °C (313–331 °F; 429–439 K)
- Except where otherwise noted, data are given for materials in their standard state (at 25 °C [77 °F], 100 kPa). Infobox references

Carane (a.k.a. Caran) is a carbobicyclic compound and monoterpene. It is often found as a part of natural oils and resins in plants like pine and spruce. Carane (alongside other monoterpenoids) is able to exhibit antioxidant properties.
