= Chemical Society Located in Taipei =

Taiwanese scholarly organization

- 中國化學會
- Formation: 4 August 1931 (in Nanking); 1950 (in Taiwan)
- Headquarters: Taipei, Taiwan
- Official language: Chinese
- Website: chemistry.org.tw

Chemical Society Located in Taipei (CSLT; Chinese: 中國化學會; lit. 'Chinese Chemical Society') is a Taiwanese scholarly organization dedicated to chemistry.

== History ==
The organization traces its roots to the establishment of Chinese Chemical Society in Nanjing in 1932 and was reestablished in Taiwan in 1950. For political reasons, the organization's English name was changed to Chemical Society Located in Taipei in 1979 although it still retained the name "Chinese Chemical Society" (中國化學會) in Chinese.

During its general representative assembly on 8 March 2025, the organization voted 75 to 4 in favor of formally changing its Chinese name to "Chemical Society of Taiwan" (台灣化學學會).

== Publications ==
CSLT and Wiley publish a monthly periodical, the Journal of the Chinese Chemical Society.

== See also ==
- Education in Taiwan
- Chinese Chemical Society (Beijing)
- Organic nomenclature in Chinese
