= Ma Pai-shui =

Chinese painter and art educator (1909–2003)

Ma Pai-shui (Chinese: 馬白水; 1909–2003), born Ma Shi-Xiang, was a painter and art educator. He was born in Shanchenggou, Benxi County, Liaoning Province, China. After settling in Taiwan in 1948, he served as a teacher for 27 years, exerting a profound influence on the education and development of watercolor painting in post-war Taiwan. In 1975, he retired and moved to the United States. He died in 2003.

== Life ==
Ma Pai-shui, born in 1909 (Qing Xuantong 1st year), was born in Liaoning, China. His father was Ma Wenxiang, and his mother, Mrs. Liu. He graduated from Liaoning Provincial Normal School with a major in fine arts and music. He has taught at various schools, including Liaoning Fifth Normal School, Fourth Normal School, Private Dacheng High School in Beiping, and Zhixing Middle School, as well as National Northeast Zhongshan Middle School. After the Sino-Japanese War, he traveled extensively and painted scenes from various locations. In 1947, he became the director of the Shanghai Yinghua Color Printing Factory. In 1948, he resigned from his position and focused on traveling and sketching. He traveled to Beijing, Shanghai, Suzhou, Hangzhou, Yangzhou, and Taihu Lake, among other places, and also traveled around Taiwan to sketch. In 1949, he held the "Ma Pai-Shui Travel Sketching Exhibition" at the Guangfu Hall of Zhongshan Hall in Taipei. In the same year, he was appointed as a professor of watercolor at Taiwan Provincial Normal College (now National Taiwan Normal University). In 1953, he established the "Baishui Studio" next to the college dormitory and recruited students, promoting the teaching of watercolor painting beyond the institution. His influence on the development of watercolor painting in Taiwan from the 1950s to the 1970s was profound. In 1957, he published "Illustrated Guide to Watercolor Painting," which became an important reference book for beginners in Taiwan. Ma Pai-Shui also held teaching positions at National Taiwan Academy of Arts (now National Taiwan University of Arts) and Chinese Culture College (now Chinese Culture University), and served as a member and chairman of the editing committee for art textbooks in primary and secondary schools at the National Compilation and Translation Institute.

After retiring in 1975, he moved to New York, United States, and traveled and exhibited his works in various countries in America, Europe, and Asia, while maintaining connections with the art scene in Taiwan. In 1990, a retrospective exhibition titled "Ma Pai-Shui Eightieth Retrospective Exhibition" was held at the Taiwan Provincial Art Museum (now National Taiwan Museum of Fine Arts). In 1993, the museum held the "Ma Pai-Shui Painting Art Research Exhibition." In 1999, the National Museum of History hosted the Retrospective of Ma Pai-Shui at Ninety and received a donation of the monumental painting The Beauty of Taroko consisting of 24 panels, which was designated as a national significant antiquity. Ma Pai-shui suffered a stroke in 1999 and died in January 2003. His artistic contributions and legacy continue to be celebrated and remembered.

== Artistic style ==
Critics often refer to Ma Pai-shui's self-descriptions as the basis for discussing his painting style. Based on his attitude towards nature, his creative journey can be divided into three stages: starting from the early stage of "describing nature" through realistic sketches, progressing to the mid-stage of "expressing nature" through freehand expressions, and finally developing into the late stage of "creating nature" with expanded styles and innovations. In his later works, Ma Pai-shui attempted to combine Eastern ink painting and Western watercolor by exploring the use of pigments, paper, brushwork, and aesthetic principles, thus pioneering a new style known as "color-ink watercolor painting."
