= Fu Chuan-fu =

Chinese painter (1910–2007)

Fu Chuan-fu (Chinese: 傅狷夫; May 2, 1910 – March 11, 2007), originally named Bao-ching (抱青) and also known as Wei-yi (唯一), with the courtesy name Jueweng (覺翁) and the pseudonym owner of Xinxiang studio (心香室主) was an ink-painter and calligrapher known for his unique style in depicting the landscapes of Taiwan. Fu Chuan-fu was born in Xihu District, Hangzhou, Zhejiang Province, China.

== Life ==
=== Early Years in Hangzhou ===
Fu Chuan-fu was born on May 2, 1910 in Xihu District, Hangzhou, Zhejiang Province, China. He officially began studying painting at the age of 17 (in 1926) and joined the Hangzhou Xiling Calligraphy and Painting Society (西泠書畫社), where he studied landscape painting under the president Wang Renzhi (王仁治) for seven years. His early landscape style was based on the Four Wangs of the early Qing dynasty, and he established a solid foundation in painting by imitating Wang's works and practicing ancient and modern works in painting albums.

=== Years in Sichuan ===
In 1937, Fu Chuan-fu moved to Sichuan with the army. In 1942, he met the famous Sichuan flower and bird painter Chen Zhi-fo (陳之佛, 1896-1962), and began to use color in his ink paintings, and his painting style began to transform. In addition, Chen Zhi-fo encouraged him to continue to develop his own style, and since then, Fu has continued to create and hold solo exhibitions in Chengdu, Chongqing and other places since 1940.

=== Taiwan period ===
In 1949, Fu Chuan-fu moved to Taiwan with the Nationalist government, where he served as a colonel and continued to create paintings and calligraphy in his spare time. He also taught calligraphy and painting in his study, "Xinxiang Studio (心香室)". In 1961, he was appointed as a professor of traditional ink painting at the Political Warfare Cadres Academy, and in 1962, he was appointed as a professor of traditional ink painting at the National Taiwan Academy of Arts, making contribution to art education and the development of ink painting in Taiwan. After retiring from military service in 1960, he devoted himself entirely to artistic creation. By combining realistic observation of nature and modern sketching concepts with traditional ink painting, he created the "rift texture (裂罅皴)" and "Mt. Tashan texture (塔山皴)" styles to depict Taiwan's rugged cliffs and rocks. Fu excelled in the "dot blotting" technique (點漬法) to express the drama of the crashing waves on the North coast and the "water stain" technique (染漬法) to depict the rapid changes in Alishan's sea of clouds, which became Fu's signature techniques. In addition to his innovations in painting techniques, Fu develop his own "lianmian cursive script" (連綿草) characterized by unrestrained brushwork gliding effortlessly between heavy and fine strokes, running into each other depending on compositional integrity, as if in a painting. Apart from teaching and creating, he published Shanshui Huafa Chujie (山水畫法初階, First Steps in Landscape Painting Technique), Xinxiang Shi Huatan (心香室畫談, On the Paintings of the Xinxiang Studio) and Xinxiang Shi Mantan (心香室漫談, Ramblings of the Xinxiang Studio). He also initiated the Liu Li Painting Society (六儷畫會), the Ren Yin Painting Society (壬寅畫會), the Ba Peng Painting Society (八朋畫會), the Chinese Calligraphy Society (中國書法學會), and the Republic of China Painting Society (中華民國畫學會). Fu Chuan-fu received numerous awards throughout his career, including the Ministry of Education's Literary Award in 1967, the National Award for Arts in 1991, the Executive Yuan's Cultural Award in 1998, and the third Arts and Business Award from the Council for Cultural Affairs in 2000. He integrated traditional and modern Chinese and Western painting techniques with his observation of Taiwan's landscape to pioneer ink painting in Taiwan. Fu Chuan-fu is regarded by Fu Shan (傅申) as and one of the best representatives of ink-painters of Taiwan's landscape.

=== Immigration to the United States ===
In 1990, Fu Chuan-fu moved to San Francisco, United States, and continued his artistic pursuits in painting and calligraphy. On March 11, 2007 (Taiwan time), he died at the age of 97 in his home in Fremont, San Francisco.
