= Chinese Chemical Society (Beijing) =

Learned society of chemistry in China

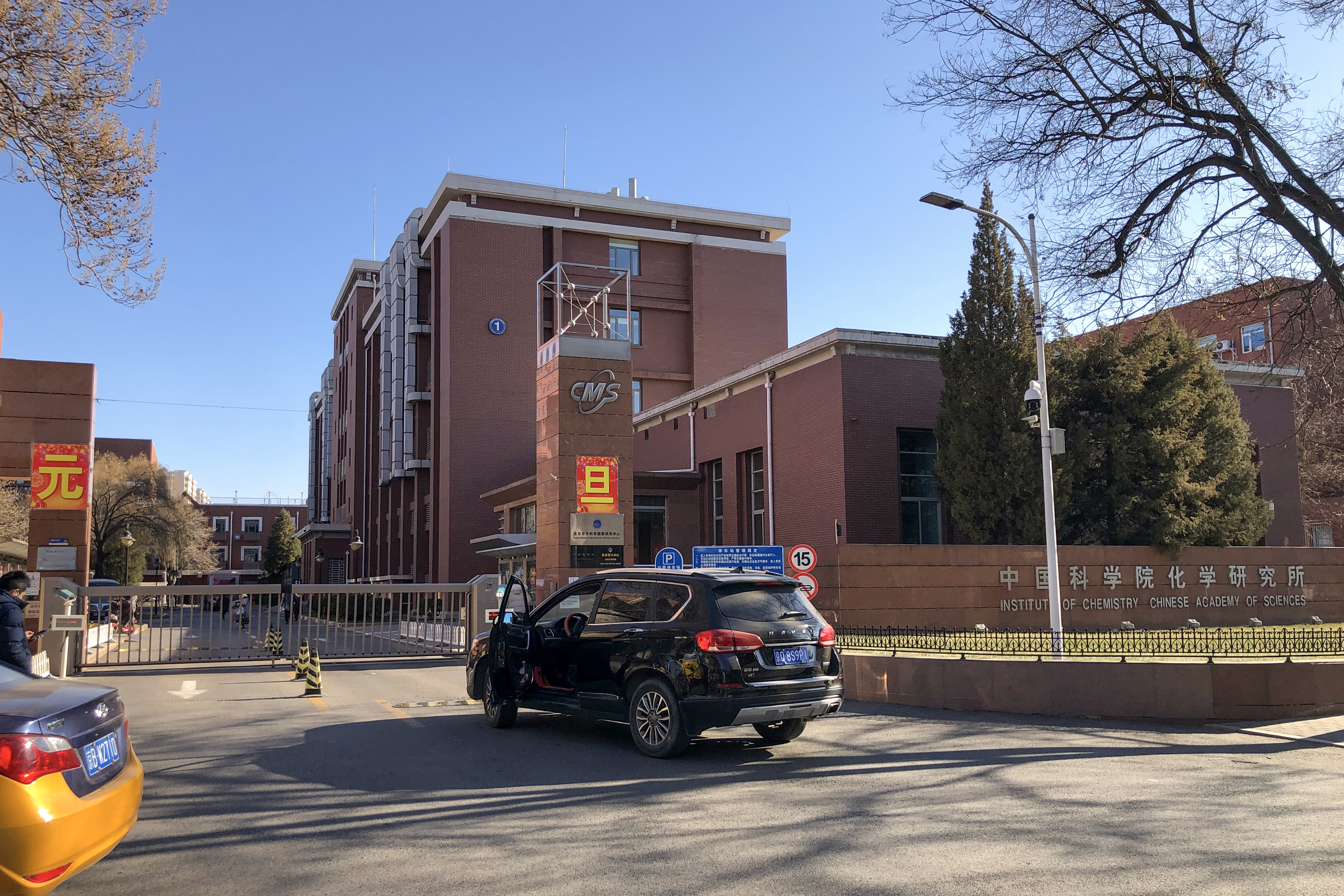
Headquarters in the Institute of Chemistry, Chinese Academy of Sciences

The Chinese Chemical Society (CCS; simplified Chinese: 中国化学会; traditional Chinese: 中國化學會) is a professional society of chemists headquartered in Beijing. It is part of the China Association for Science and Technology. Current membership is at around 55,000.

== History ==
The CCS was founded in Nanjing on August 4, 1932. It merged with the Chinese Chemical Engineering Society in 1959. The organizations were separated again in 1963. CCS has been a member of the International Union of Pure and Applied Chemistry (IUPAC) since 1980 and of the Federation of Asian Chemical Societies (FACS) since 1984.

== International affiliations ==
- Pacific Polymer Federation (PPF)
- International Society of Electrochemistry (ISE)
- International Association of Catalysis Societies (IACS)
- International Confederation for Thermal Analysis and Calorimetry (ICTAC)

== Publications ==
The CCS publishes many academic journals, including:

- CCS Chemistry
- Acta Chimica Sinica
- Chinese J. Chemistry
- Chinese Chemical Letters
- Chemistry Bulletin
- Acta Physico-Chimica Sinica
- Journal of Inorganic Chemistry
- Organic Chemistry
- Analytical Chemistry
- Journal of Applied Chemistry
- Journal of Chromatography
- Organic Chemistry
- Acta Polymerica Sinica
- Chinese J. Polym. Sci.
- Polymer Bulletin
- Electrochemistry
- Journal of Catalysis
- Chinese J. Molecular Science
- Journal of Fuel Chemistry and Technology
- Journal of Structural Chemistry
- University Chemistry
- Journal of Chemical Education

== See also ==
- Chemical Society Located in Taipei
