= National Museum of History (Taiwan) =

Museum in Taipei, Taiwan

- 國立歷史博物館
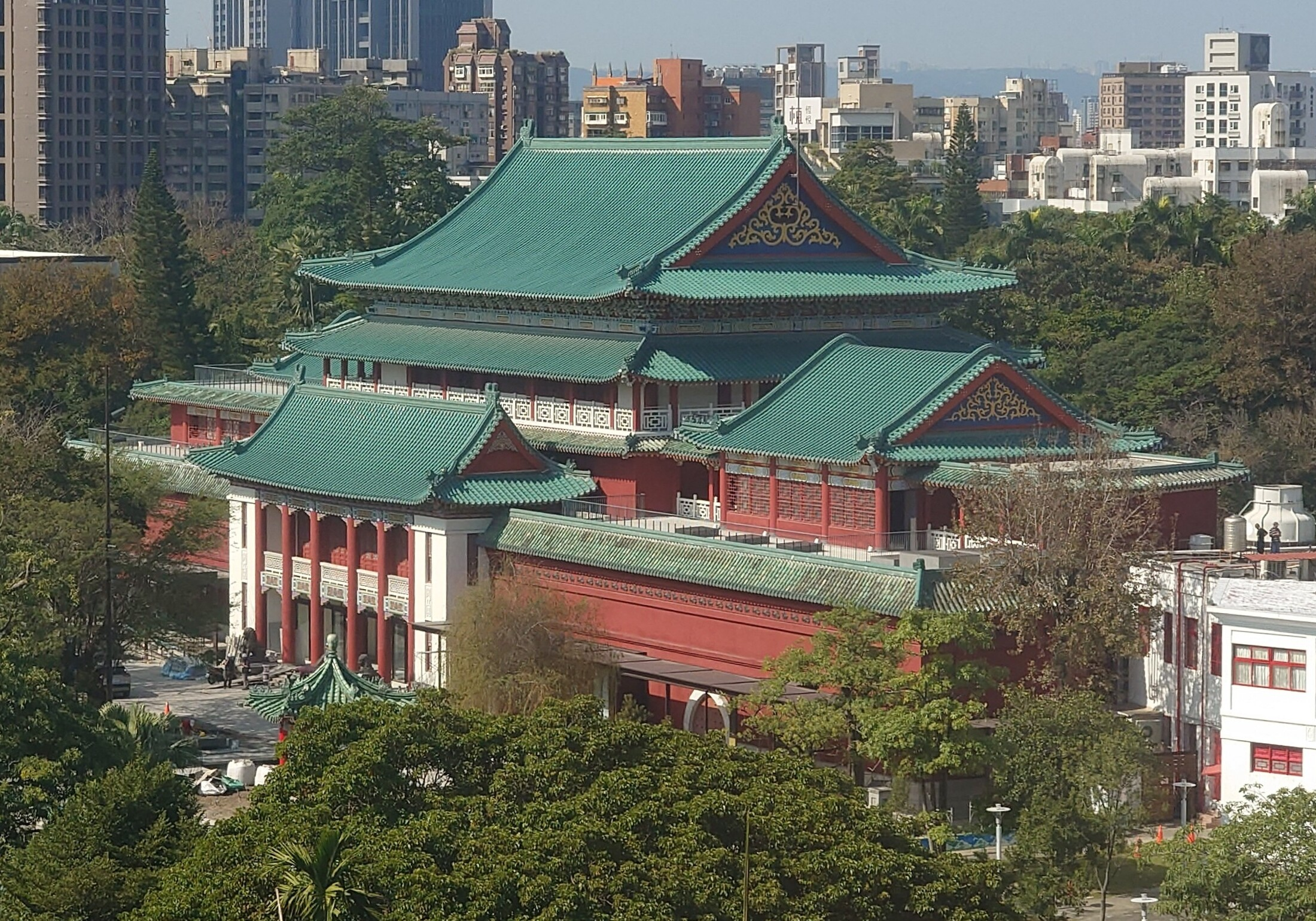
- Former name: National Museum of Historical Artifacts and Fine Arts
- Established: 1955
- Location: Zhongzheng, Taipei, Taiwan
- Coordinates: 25°1′52.89″N 121°30′40.35″E
- Director: Liang Yung Fei
- Owner: Government of the Republic of China
- Website: www.nmh.gov.tw/en/

The National Museum of History (NMH; Chinese: 國立歷史博物館; pinyin: Guólì Lìshǐ Bówùguǎn) is located in the Nanhai Academy in Zhongzheng District, Taipei, Taiwan. After the Republic of China government moved to Taiwan, the National Museum of History was the first museum to be established in Taiwan.

== History ==
A "National Museum of Historical Artifacts and Fine Arts" was established in a Japanese style building near the Taipei Botanical Garden in 1955. It was renamed "National Museum of History" in 1956 and the building was renovated in a five-floor traditional Chinese Ming and Qing palace style, with four floors for exhibition and staff offices, and one floor for storage. Despite its limited space, the NMH is renowned for its international exhibitions, and museum development and educational programs. Various conversions of the building have been carried out over the years to adapt it as a modern space fit for the newest exhibition facilities and requirements.

The NMH's collection originally comprised the artifacts of the Henan Museum that were relocated to Taiwan in 1949, and of relics recovered from the Japanese after the Sino-Japanese War. It was named the National Museum of History in 1949 and the Chinese calligraphy title inscription was completed by famous scholar Yu Youren. The collection included bronzes unearthed in Xinzheng, Hui and Anyang (in Henan Province), Pre-Qin pottery unearthed in Luoyang, Han green-glazed pottery, dancer and musician figurines of the Six Dynasties, Tang tri-colored pottery, and more. The arrival of allocated artifacts and donations from private collectors gradually enriched the museum's collection and enlarged its archives.

In July 2018 the museum was closed for renovations and reopened on 21 February 2024.

== Collection ==
The museum collections continued to grow with annual acquisitions obtained with government procurement budget allocations and donations from private collectors. The annual acquisitions provided the museum with artifacts and relics from mainland China, Taiwan, and other countries. The collections dated back to the Neolithic period, the ancient Chinese dynasties of Shang, Zhou, Han, Tang, Song, Yuan, Ming, and Qing, to the contemporary era.

== Branch ==
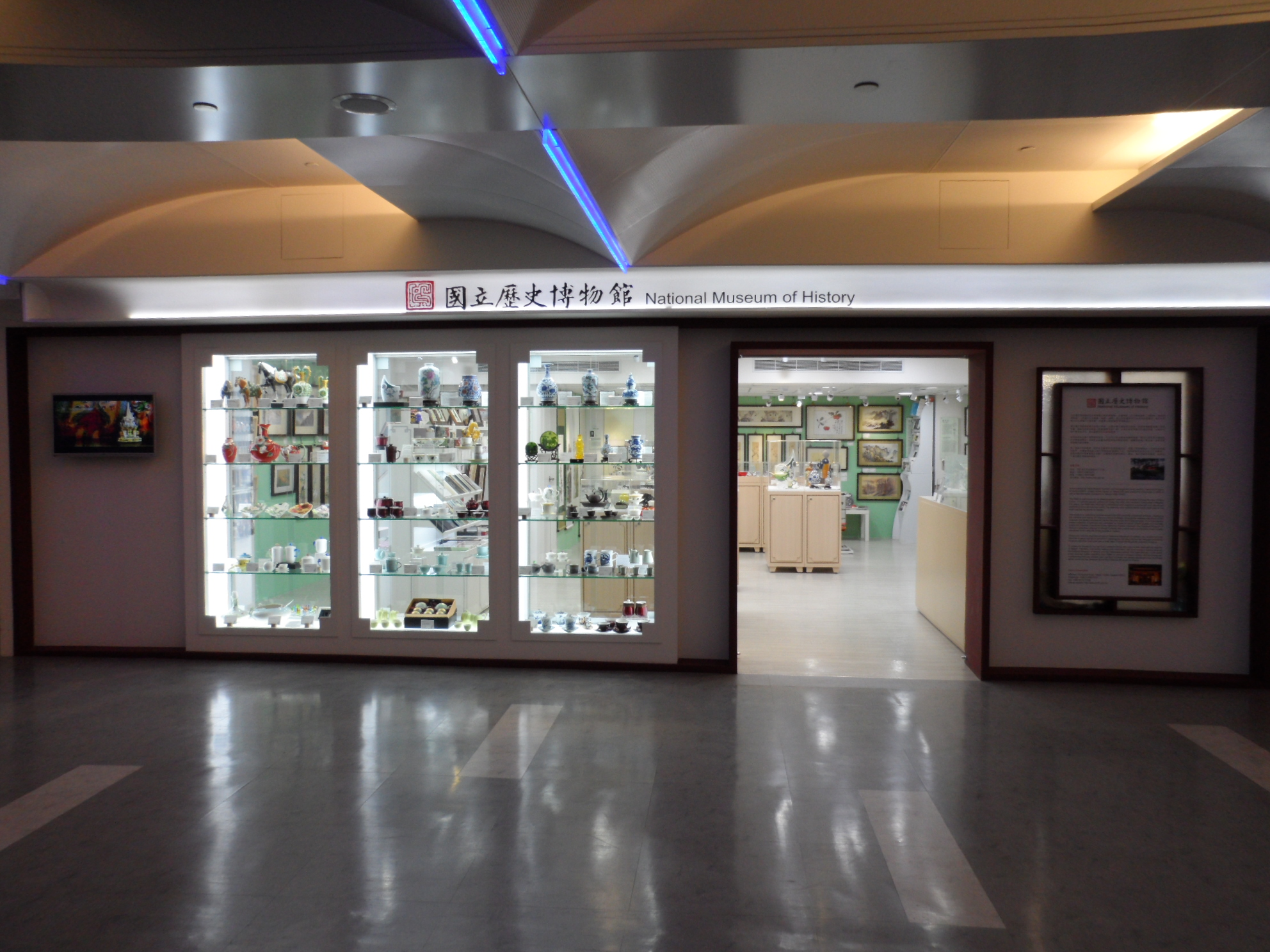
National Museum of History at Taiwan Taoyuan International Airport

The National Museum of History has its branch in Terminal 1 building of the Taiwan Taoyuan International Airport in Taoyuan City.

== Transportation ==
The museum is accessible within walking distance South of Xiaonanmen Station or Chiang Kai-shek Memorial Hall metro station of the Taipei Metro.

== Directors ==
- Pao Tsun-peng (March 1956 – May 1969)
- Wang Yu-ching (May 1969 – July 1973)
- Ho Hao-tien (July 1973 – October 1985)
- Lee Ting-yuan (October 1985 – February 1986)
- Chen Kuei-miao (February 1986 – February 1990)
- Chen Kang-shun
- Huang Kuang-nan
- Huang Yung-chuan
- Tseng Te-chin
- Huang Yung-chuan
- Chang Yui-tan (2010 – January 2017)
- Chen Teng-chin
- Chen Chi-ming
- Liao Hsin-tien
- LIANG Yung-fei
- Wang Chang-hua (incumbent)

== See also ==
- List of museums in Taiwan
- Henan Museum
