= Codex Seraphinianus =

Illustrated encyclopedia by Luigi Serafini

- The original two-volume work
- Author: Luigi Serafini
- Language: Imaginary
- Subject: Flora, Fauna, Anatomy, Fashion and Foods
- Publisher: Franco Maria Ricci
- Publication date: 1981
- Publication place: Italy
- Pages: 127 (Vol. I); 127 (Vol. II)
- ISBN: 88-216-0026-2; ISBN 88-216-0027-0; ISBN 88-216-2027-1
- Dewey Decimal: 039 (Encyclopedias in other languages)

The Codex Seraphinianus is an illustrated encyclopedia of an imaginary world, created by Italian artist, architect and industrial designer Luigi Serafini between 1976 and 1978 and first published in 1981. It has approximately 360 pages (depending on edition) and is written in an imaginary writing system.

Originally published in Italy, it has been released in several countries.

== Description ==
The Codex is an encyclopedia in manuscript with copious hand-drawn, colored-pencil illustrations of bizarre and fantastical flora, fauna, anatomies, fashions, and foods. It has been compared to the still undeciphered Voynich manuscript, the story "Tlön, Uqbar, Orbis Tertius" by Jorge Luis Borges, and the artwork of M. C. Escher and Hieronymus Bosch.

The illustrations are often surreal parodies of things in the real world, such as a bleeding fruit, a plant that grows into roughly the shape of a chair and is subsequently made into one, and a copulating couple who metamorphose into an alligator. Others depict odd, apparently senseless machines, often with delicate appearances and bound by tiny filaments. Some illustrations are recognizable as maps or human faces, while others (especially in the "physics" chapter) are mostly or totally abstract. Nearly all of the illustrations are brightly coloured and highly detailed.

== Writing system ==
The false writing system appears modeled on Western writing systems, with left-to-right writing in rows and an alphabet with uppercase and lowercase letters, some of which double as numerals. Some letters appear only at the beginning or end of words, similar to Semitic writing systems. The curvilinear letters are rope- or thread-like, with loops and even knots, and are somewhat reminiscent of Sinhala script.

In a talk at the Oxford University Society of Bibliophiles on 11 May 2009, Serafini stated that there is no meaning behind the Codex's script, which is asemic; that his experience in writing it was similar to automatic writing; and that what he wanted his alphabet to convey was the sensation children feel with books they cannot yet understand, although they see that the writing makes sense for adults. However, the book's page-numbering system was decoded by Allan C. Wechsler and Bulgarian linguist Ivan Derzhanski, as being a variation of base 21.

== Contents ==
The book is in 11 chapters, in two sections. The first section appears to describe the natural world of flora, fauna and physics. The second deals with various aspects of human life, including garments, history, cuisine and architecture. Each chapter seems to address a general encyclopedic topic, as follows:

1. Types of flora: strange flowers, trees that uproot themselves and migrate, etc.
2. Fauna (animals), including surreal variations of the horse, hippopotamus, rhinoceros and birds
3. An apparently separate kingdom of odd bipedal creatures
4. Physics and chemistry (generally considered the most abstract, enigmatic chapter)
5. Bizarre machines and vehicles
6. The humanities: biology, sexuality, aboriginal peoples, including some examples with plant life and tools (e.g. pens, wrenches) grafted onto the human body
7. History: people (some only vaguely human) of unknown significance, with their times of birth and death; scenes of historical and possibly religious significance; burial and funeral customs
8. The Codex's writing system (which is to say, the – or probably, a – writing system of the world (if a world it is) from which the codex originates, or which it documents), including punctuation marks, the text being written, and experiments performed upon the text
9. Food, dining practices, garments
10. Bizarre games, including cards, board games and athletic sports
11. Architecture

After the last chapter is a table of contents or index, followed by an apparent afterword whose writing is more casually rendered.

Two plates in the sixth chapter contain lines of French text, a quote from Marcel Proust's "À la recherche du temps perdu: Albertine disparue" (In Search of Lost Time: Albertine Gone). The words scattered on the floor of the illustration are from the same book.

== Editions ==
Cover of Abbeville edition

The original edition was issued in two volumes:

- Luigi Serafini, Codex Seraphinianus, Milano: Franco Maria Ricci [I segni dell'uomo, 27–28], 1981, 127+127 pp., 108+128 plates, ISBN 88-216-0026-2 + ISBN 88-216-0027-0.

Two years later, a single-volume edition was issued in the United States, in Germany and in the Netherlands:

- 1st American edition, New York: Abbeville Press, 1983, 370 pp., ISBN 0-89659-428-9;
- Munich: Prestel, 1983, 370 pp., ISBN 3-7913-0651-0;
- Amsterdam: Meulenhoff/Landshoff, 1983, ISBN 90-290-8402-2.

The 1980s editions were out of print for several years before Franco Maria Ricci published an augmented, single-volume edition in 1993:

- French augmented edition, with a preface by Italo Calvino, transl. by Yves Hersant and Geneviève Lambert, Milano: Franco Maria Ricci [Les signes de l'homme, 18], 1993, 392 pp., ISBN 88-216-2027-1;
- Spanish augmented edition, with a preface by Italo Calvino, transl. by C. Alonso, Milano: Franco Maria Ricci [Los signos del hombre, 15], 1993, 392 pp., ISBN 88-216-6027-3.

In 2006, Rizzoli published an expanded, but less expensive, edition in Italy. It features additional illustrations and a preface by the author:

- Milano: Rizzoli, 2006, 384 pp., ISBN 88-17-01389-7;
- Milano: Rizzoli, 2008, 384 pp.

In 2013, Rizzoli published a second revised edition, as well as limited, signed, and numbered "deluxe" edition. They printed 300 copies in Italian and 300 in English:

- Milano: Rizzoli, 2013, 396 pp., ISBN 0-8478-4213-4

In 2016, a 2017 Codex Seraphinianus wall calendar was published by Universe Publishing.

- Universe Publishing, 2016, 24 pp., ISBN 978-0789332158

Rizzoli published a 40th anniversary edition of Codex Seraphinianus with some additional material in 2021.

- Milano: Rizzoli, 2021, 416pp., ISBN 0-8478-7104-5

== Reception ==
Baird Searles, in Asimov's Science Fiction (April 1984), says "the book lies in the uneasy boundary between surrealism and fantasy, given an odd literary status by its masquerade as a book of fact".

Douglas Hofstadter, in Metamagical Themas, finds many of the illustrations "grotesque and disturbing" and others "extremely beautiful and visionary". He says the book "seems [to some people] to glorify entropy, chaos, and incomprehensibility".

American journalist Jim Dwyer finds that the work is an early critique of the Information Age.

== See also ==
- The Voynich manuscript, an illustrated codex hand-written in an unknown writing system from the early 15th century
- A Book from the Sky, a similar book by Chinese artist Xu Bing, consisting of new, meaningless Chinese characters, printed from hand-carved blocks
- Fantastic Planet, a French film consisting of similar abstract imagery
- After Man and Man After Man by Dougal Dixon, books illustrating speculated future zoology and anthropology, respectively.
- The Atlas des Géographes d'Orbæ, a French young adult fiction series by François Place, blending storytelling with richly illustrated maps to depict an imaginative world.
