= Asemic writing =

Wordless open semantic form of writing

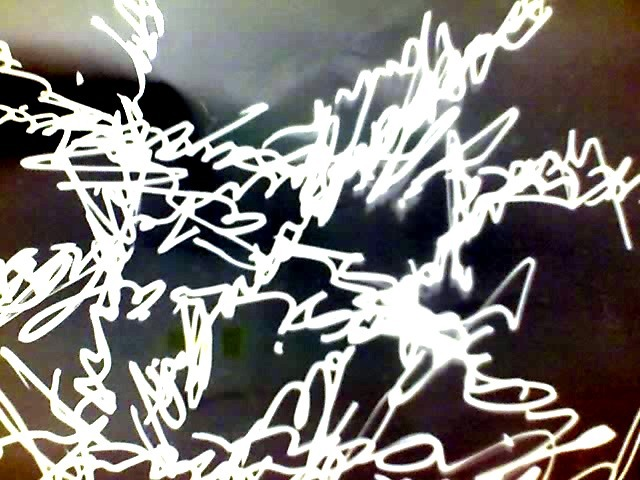
Asemic writing from Marco Giovenale

Asemic writing is a wordless open semantic form of writing. The word asemic /eɪˈsiːmɪk/ means "having no specific semantic content", or "without the smallest unit of meaning". (Note: From Greek asemos (ἄσημος), meaning 'without sign', 'unmarked', 'obscure', or 'ignoble'.) Asemic writing fuses text and image together, while minimising the use of gestures, lines and symbols. Its non-specificity leaves readers to interpret its meaning – such works can have multiple meanings that evolve over time. The open nature of asemic works allows for meaning to occur across linguistic understanding; an asemic text may be "read" in a similar fashion regardless of the reader's natural language.

== Styles ==
Asemic writing exists in many different forms. It is often created with a pen or brush, but can range from being hand drawn in the sand with a stick and documented by photography, or to works on canvas, paper, computer images, and animations. The key to asemic writing is that even though it is traditionally "unreadable" it still maintains a strong attractive appeal to the reader's eye. Various asemic writing includes pictograms, or ideograms the meanings of which are sometimes suggested by their shapes, though it may also flow as an abstract expressionist scribble which resembles writing but avoids words. Asemic writing, at times, exists as a conception or shadow of conventional writing practices. Reflecting writing, but not completely existing as a traditional writing system, asemic writing seeks to make the reader hover in a state between reading and looking.

Asemic writing has no verbal sense, though it may have clear textual sense. Through its formatting and structure, asemic writing may suggest a type of document and, thereby, suggest a meaning. The form of art is still writing, often calligraphic in form, and either depends on a reader's sense and knowledge of writing systems for it to make sense, or can be understood through aesthetic intuition. True asemic writing occurs when the creator of the asemic piece cannot read their own asemic writing. Relative asemic writing is a natural writing system that can be read by some people but not by everyone (e.g. ciphers, wildstyle, etc.). Most asemic writing lies between these two extremes. Influences on asemic writing are illegible, invented, or primal scripts (cave paintings, doodles, children's drawings, etc.). But instead of being thought of as mimicry of preliterate expression, asemic writing may be considered to be a global postliterate style of writing that uses all forms of creativity for inspiration. Other influences on asemic writing are alien languages in science fiction, artistic languages, sigils, undeciphered scripts, and graffiti. Uses for asemic writing include mental and creative idea stimulation, non-verbal communication, meditation, hoaxes, curing writer's block, privacy, and general authorial self-expression.

== History ==
Newsletter from Mirtha Dermisache

In 1997, visual poets Tim Gaze and Jim Leftwich first applied the word asemic to name their quasi-calligraphic writing gestures. The authors explored sub-verbal and sub-letteral forms of writing, and textual asemia as a creative option and as an intentional practice. Since the late 1990s, asemic writing has blossomed into a worldwide literary/art movement. Its popularity has especially grown in the early part of the 21st century, though there is an acknowledgement of a long and complex history, which precedes the activities of the current asemic movement, especially with regard to abstract calligraphy, wordless writing, and verbal writing damaged beyond the point of legibility. Jim Leftwich has recently stated that an asemic condition of an asemic work is an impossible goal, and that it is not possible to create an literary work entirely without meaning. Others such as author Travis Jeppesen have found the term asemic to be problematic because "it seems to infer writing with no meaning."

Asemic writing occurs in avant-garde literature and art with strong roots in the earliest forms of writing. The history of today's asemic movement stems from two Chinese calligraphers: "crazy" Zhang Xu, a Tang dynasty (c. 800 CE) calligrapher who was famous for creating wild illegible calligraphy, and the younger "drunk" monk Huaisu who also excelled at illegible cursive calligraphy. Japanese calligraphers subsequently expanded upon Chinese abstract calligraphic expression by Hitsuzendō (the way of Zen through brush), allowing their works to move past formal presentation and "breathe with the vitality of eternal experience".

In the 1920s, Man Ray, who was influenced by Dada, created an early work of wordless writing with his poem Paris, Mai 1924. Later in the 1920s, Henri Michaux, who was influenced by Asian calligraphy, Surrealism, and Automatic writing, began to create wordless works such as Alphabet (1925) and Narration (1927). Michaux referred to his calligraphic works as "interior Gestures". The writer and artist Wassily Kandinsky was an early precursor to asemic writing, with his linear piece Indian Story (1931) exemplifying complete textual abstraction.

In the 1950s, there is Brion Gysin (whose calligraphy was influenced by Japanese and Arabic calligraphy), Isidore Isou (who founded Lettrisme/Letterism), Cy Twombly (a former US Army Cryptologist), and Morita Shiryū/Bokujin-kai Group (Ink Human Society) all of whom expanded writing into illegible, abstract, and wordless visual mark-making; they would help lay the foundation for asemic writers of the future. Mira Schendel was an artist from Brazil who created many illegible works over the course of her life, for example her piece Archaic Writing (1964). Mirtha Dermisache is another writer who had created asemic writing since the 1960s. Dermisache actively said that even though her graphisms have no meaning, they still retained the full rights of an autonomous work. Angus MacLise was a musician and poet who also created asemic calligraphic works in the 1960s. 1971 was the year when Alain Satié released his work Écrit en prose ou L'Œuvre hypergraphique which contains asemic writing throughout the entire collage graphic novel. León Ferrari was another artist/poet who created many asemic works in the 1960s and 1970s, such as Escritura (1976). 1974 saw the release of Max Ernst's work Maximiliana: The Illegal Practice Of Astronomy: hommage à Dorothea Tanning; this book is a major influence on asemic writers such as Tim Gaze, Michael Jacobson, and Derek Beaulieu. Roland Barthes was also involved with asemic writing; he titled his asemic works Contre-écritures. Irma Blank was another important contributor to asemic writing.

A modern example of asemic writing is Luigi Serafini's Codex Seraphinianus (1981). Serafini described the script of the Codex as asemic in a talk at the Oxford University Society of Bibliophiles held on 8 May 2009. In the 1980s, Chinese artist Xu Bing created Tiānshū, or A Book from the Sky which is a work of books and hanging scrolls on which were printed 4000 hand carved meaningless characters. The 1980s also saw artist Gu Wenda begin the first of a series of projects centered on the invention of meaningless, false Chinese ideograms, depicted as if they were truly old and traditional. One exhibition of this type was held in Xi'an in 1986, featuring paintings of fake ideograms on a massive scale. Also in China, during the 1990s, an abstract calligraphy movement known as "Calligraphy-ism" came into existence, a leading proponent of this movement being Luo Qi. Calligraphy-ism is an aesthetic movement that aims to develop calligraphy into an abstract art. The characters do not need to retain their traditional forms or be legible as words. In Vietnam during the 2000s, a calligraphy group called the Zenei Gang of Five appeared. To this group of young artists, "Wordless" means that which cannot be said, that which is both before and beyond the specificity of naming. To be without words is saying nothing and saying everything.

Satu Kaikkonen, a contemporary asemic artist/writer from Finland, had this to say about asemic writing:

As a creator of asemics, I consider myself an explorer and a global storyteller. Asemic art, after all, represents a kind of language that's universal and lodged deep within our unconscious minds. Regardless of language identity, each human's initial attempts to create written language look very similar and, often, quite asemic. In this way, asemic art can serve as a sort of common language—albeit an abstract, post-literate one—that we can use to understand one another regardless of background or nationality. For all its limping-functionality, semantic language all too often divides and asymmetrically empowers while asemic texts can't help but put people of all literacy-levels and identities on equal footing.

Bruce Sterling comments about asemic writing on his Wired magazine blog Beyond the Beyond:

Writing that doesn't have any actual writing in it whatsoever. You would think that this must be some kind of ultimate literary frontier, a frozen Antarctica of writing entirely devoid of literary content, but I wonder. What is "beyond asemic writing"? Maybe a neural brain-scan of an author *thinking about* asemic writing. Maybe *generative asemic writing*. Maybe "asemic biomimicry". Maybe nanoasemic writing inscribed with atomic force microscopes by Artificial Intelligences.

== False writing systems ==
False writing systems are artificially constructed alphabets or scripts used (sometimes within the context of a false document) to convey a degree of verisimilitude. Examples of this include alien dialogue in comic strips, animated cartoons, graphic novels (such as Alan Moore's The League of Extraordinary Gentlemen, and the Valérian and Laureline series), and video games.

The script in Luigi Serafini's 1981 Codex Seraphinianus was confirmed by the author to have no occult meaning. The Voynich manuscript uses an undeciphered writing system which some have speculated to be a hoax.

In the video game Outer Wilds, a key gameplay element is reading inscriptions created by a fictional alien race called the Nomai. The scripted messages follow a spiral shape and branch off each other to facilitate easy replies to other aliens’ writings. The actual letters, however, are made up of indiscernible shapes somewhat reminiscent to biological molecules. It is a false script, because careful investigation reveals that it consists of one consistent pattern, occasionally modified in various ways. Though generators have been made, these still are not true writing systems because they usually rely on converting text to numbers and choosing shapes based on this.

== Gallery ==
Math Minus Math: a text of asemic math by Rosaire Appel

Title page of Tiānshū (A Book from the Sky) by Xu Bing, in pseudo-Chinese characters. The characters "天書" (Tiānshū) do not appear anywhere in the book.

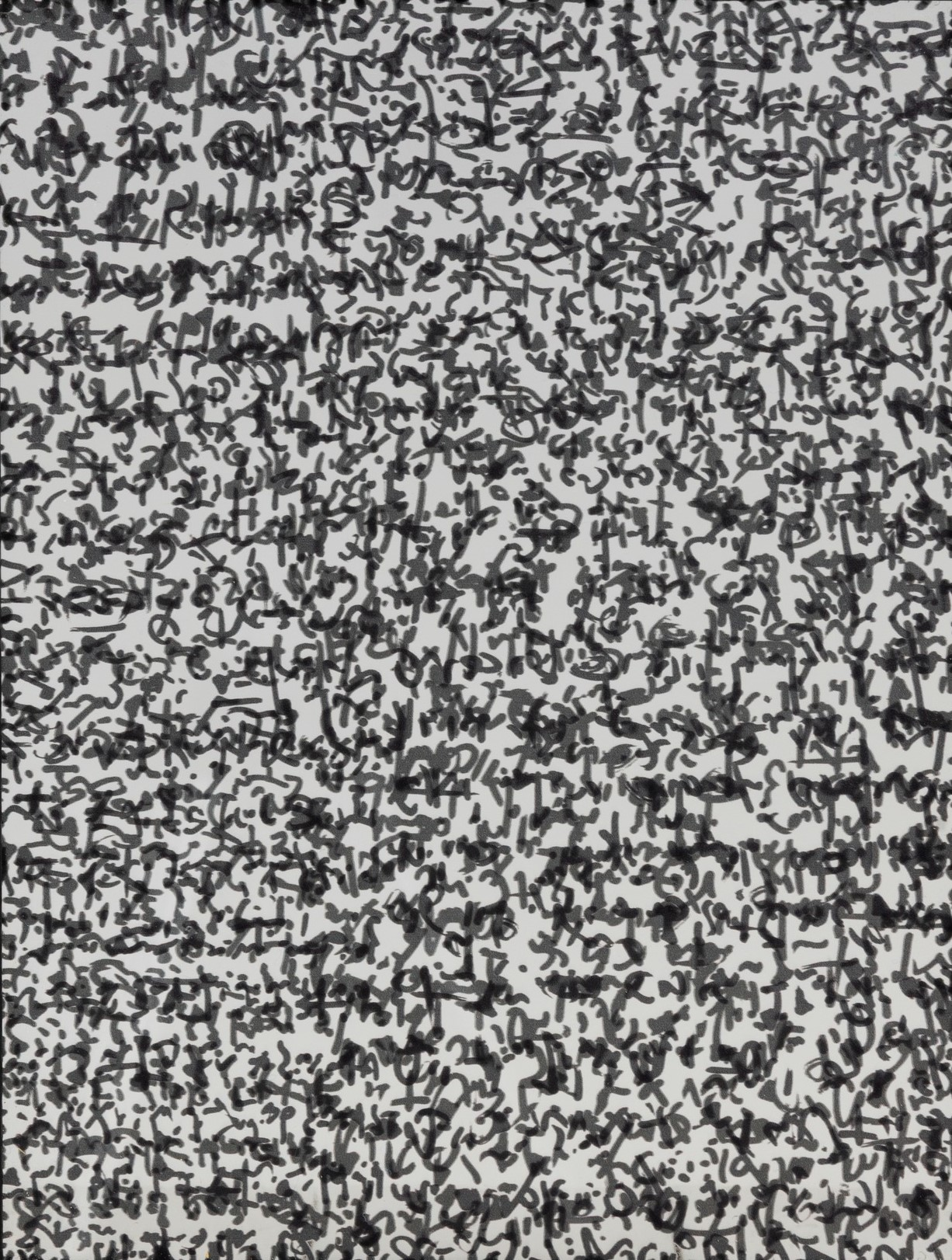
Asemic writing from Giuseppe Calandriello

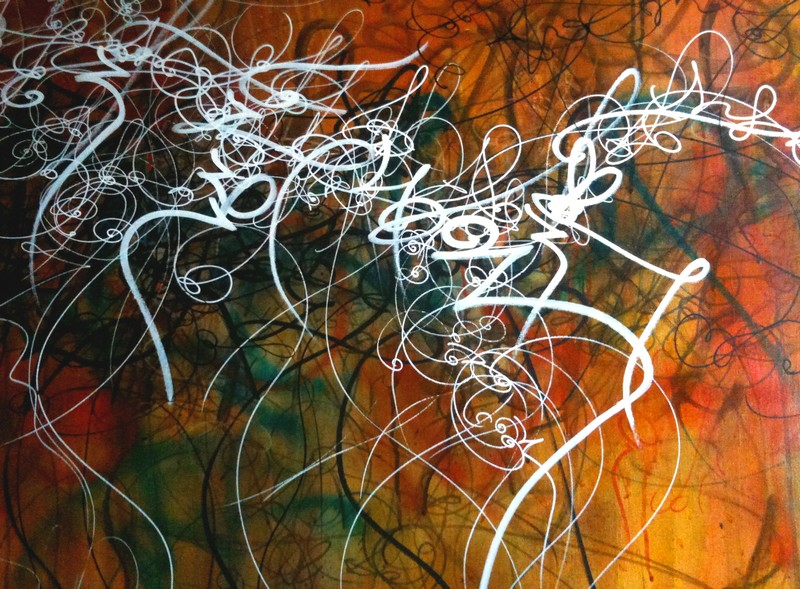
Asemic Post-Graffiti from Nuno de Matos (AKA Matox)

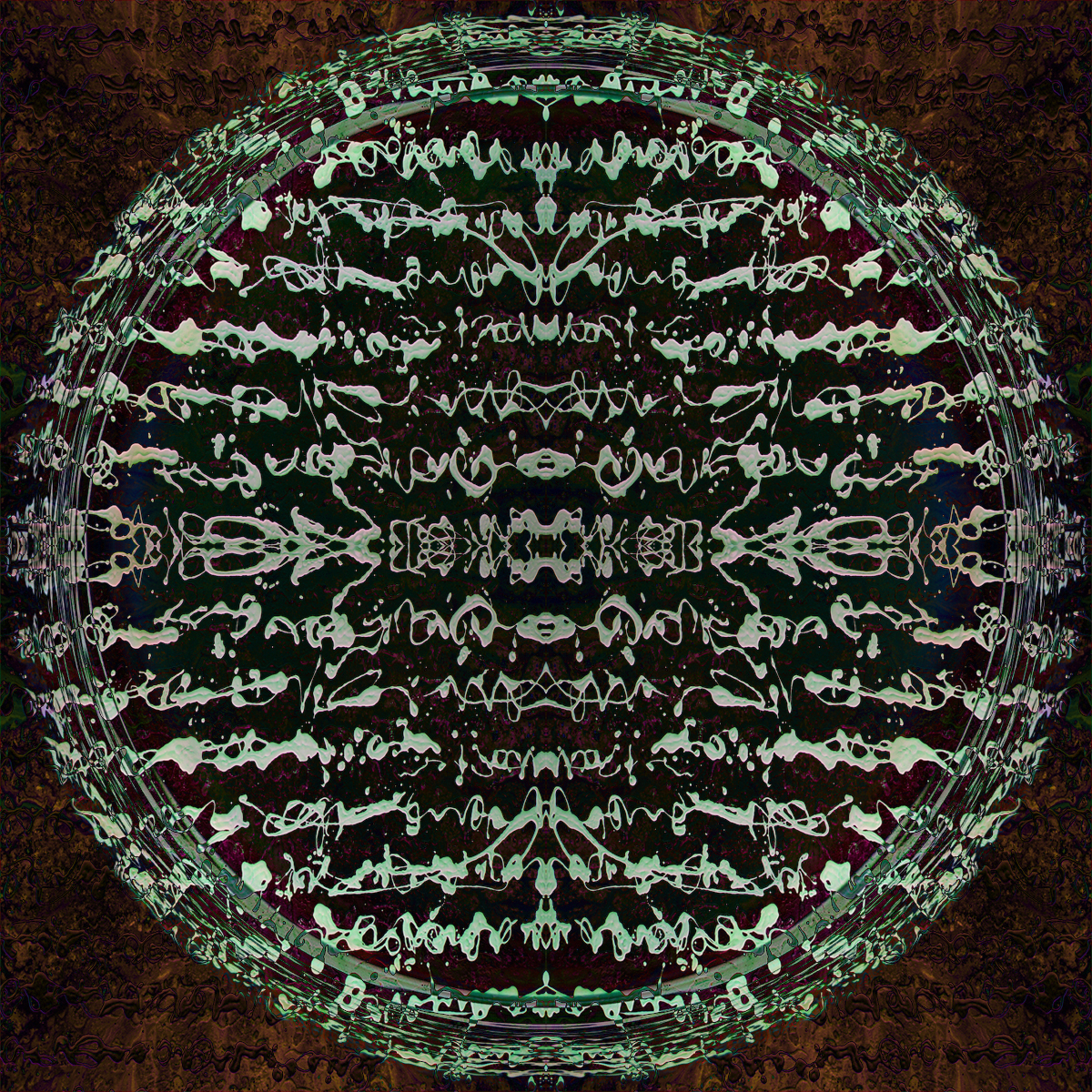
Asemic writing from Jean-Christophe Giacottino

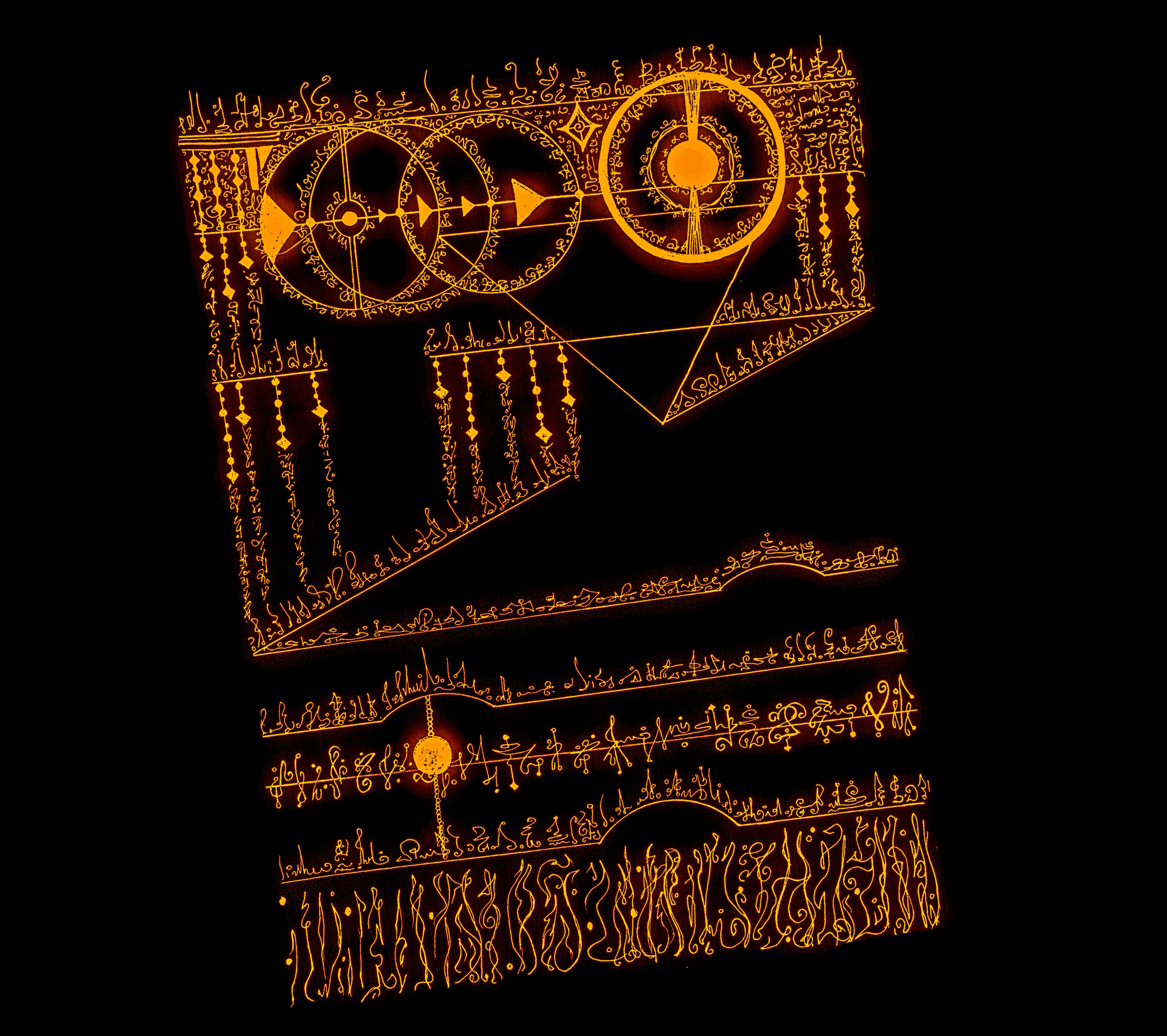
The Wheels of Transformation – asemic writing by Tatiana Roumelioti

== See also ==
- Arche-writing – Concept in the philosophy of language
- Glossolalia – Phenomenon in which people speak words apparently in languages unknown to them
- Pseudo-Kufic – Imitations of Arabic in European Middle Ages and Renaissance art
- Rorschach test – Projective psychological test created in 1921
- Sound poetry – Artistic form bridging literacy and musical composition
- Charaktêres – Letter-shaped signs used as magic in ancient literary documents
