= Luigi Serafini =

Luigi Serafini may refer to

- Luigi Serafini (artist) (born 1949), Italian artist and designer
- Luigi Serafini (basketball) (born 1951), Italian basketball player
- Luigi Serafini (cardinal) (1808–1894), Roman Catholic bishop and cardinal
