= John Sparrow (academic) =

British academic, barrister and book-collector (1906–1992)

John Hanbury Angus Sparrow OBE (13 November 1906 – 24 January 1992) was an English academic, barrister, book-collector, and Warden of All Souls College, Oxford, from 1952 to 1977.

== Early life and education ==
Sparrow was born on 13 November 1906 at New Oxley, Bushbury, near Wolverhampton, the eldest of five children born to Isaac Saredon Sparrow, a barrister who had inherited wealth through the family business as prominent Midland ironmasters, and Margaret, née Macgregor.

Sparrow briefly attended the junior house of Wolverhampton Grammar School, but was soon moved to Brockhurst at Church Stretton in Shropshire as a boarder. Not long after, in September 1916, when he was nearly ten, he was sent to a preparatory school called The Old Hall at Wellington in Shropshire. His formal education followed at Winchester College and New College, Oxford.

== Career ==
=== Academia ===
Sparrow was elected Fellow of All Souls College, Oxford, in 1929, winning a prize fellowship the same year H. L. A. Hart sat (unsuccessfully) for the first time, as he did for a second time a year later. He became Warden of All Souls (1952–77) in an election in which he famously defeated A. L. Rowse. He was also a Fellow of Winchester (1951–81) and an Honorary Fellow of New College (1956–1992). In Oxford he was well known as a book-collector and bibliographer, and became President of the Oxford University Society of Bibliophiles, in which role he influenced a generation of Oxford bookmen. He was appointed an Officer of the Order of the British Empire (OBE).

Sparrow held the Sandars Readership in Bibliography in 1963 and lectured on "The inscription and the book."

Sparrow was homosexual, and ironically, became most known beyond Oxford for an article he wrote in 1962 for the literary magazine Encounter on Lady Chatterley's Lover, following the obscenity trial. He sought to point out that the climatic sexual scene in the novel involved buggery, a fact that neither judge nor jury at the book's trial had been aware of, due to Lawrence's vague description, therefore suggesting the verdict at the trial may not have been in the book's favour had they known. Sparrow wrote that he found the novel "extremely distasteful", and also argued that anal intercourse formed an approved part of Lawrence's "sexual creed". Due to the fact these aspects of the novel, and of Lawrence, were not then commonly accepted, the article provoked a storm of academic debate, to which Sparrow replied in two published letters that were as prolix on the matter as his original article.

=== Law ===
Sparrow was called to the Bar at the Middle Temple (1931, Honorary Bencher 1952), practising in the Chancery Division (1931–39, 1946–51).

== Personal life ==
Sparrow died on 24 January 1992 at Iffley, near Oxford, where he had lived at Beechwood House since retiring as warden of All Souls College, Oxford in 1977.

== Biographies ==
Sparrow is the subject of two biographies:

- The Warden: A Portrait of John Sparrow by John Lowe (HarperCollins, 1998)
- John Sparrow: Warden of All Souls College, Oxford by Peter Raina (Peter Lang, 2018)

== Publications ==
He published more than fifty books and essays on topics including epigraphy, painting, and Latin and English poetry. Among the more substantial are:

- Half-Lines and Repetitions in Virgil (1931)
- Sense and Poetry. Essays on the Place of Meaning in Contemporary Verse (1934)
- Independent Essays (1963)
- Controversial Essays (1966)
- Mark Pattison and the Idea of a University (1967) (the Clark Lecture 1965)
- Visible Words. A Study of Inscriptions in and as Books and Works of Art (1969)
- Too Much of a Good Thing (1977)
- Renaissance Latin Verse. An Anthology (ed. with Alessandro Perosa, 1979)
- Words on the Air. Essays on Language, Manners, Morals and Laws (1981)

One of his best known remarks describes the dog as "that indefatigable and unsavoury engine of pollution".
