= Luigi Serafini (artist) =

Italian artist

Luigi Serafini (born 4 August 1949 in Rome) is an Italian artist and designer based in Milan. He is best known for creating the Codex Seraphinianus, an illustrated encyclopedia of imaginary things in what was believed to be a constructed language. This work was published in 1981 by Franco Maria Ricci.

== Career ==
During the 1980s Serafini worked as an architect and designer in Milan. His objects were often defined by a metalanguage aptitude, like the chairs Santa and Suspiral or the lamps and the glass for Artemide. He has created scenery, lighting and costumes for the ballet "The Jazz Calendar" by Frederick Ashton at Teatro Alla Scala and also worked for the Piccolo Teatro di Milano. He has created set designs acronyms/logos for RAI, and worked with Federico Fellini on La voce della luna.

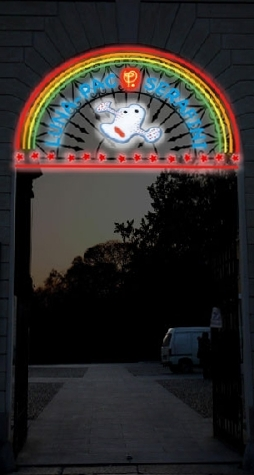
Luna-PAC Serafini

He has a laboratory of ceramics in Umbria, and exhibits his work regularly, especially in the Netherlands. He has been a visiting artist at the Banff Centre, and has exhibited at the Fondazione Mudima di Milano, the XIII Quadriennale, the Galleria Nazionale d'Arte Moderna (National Gallery of Modern Art) in Rome, Futurarium in Chicago, and Didael Gallery in Milan. In 2003 he made a polychrome bronze sculpture, Carpe Diem, and other bas-reliefs for the Materdei subway station in Naples. In July 2008, he completed a polychrome installation "Balançoires sans Frontières" (Altalene senza Frontiere) in Castasegna, Switzerland.

In May 2007, he held an "ontological exhibition", Luna Pac, at PAC in Milan. His work has been profiled in many Italian media and art publications.

=== Codex Seraphinianus ===
The Codex Seraphinianus was originally released in a limited edition of 5000 copies in 1981. It has been reprinted on five occasions, first in a 1983 English language edition; then in Spanish and French in the 1990s, again in a limited number of 5000 copies each; and finally in more widely printed editions in 2006 and 2013. In 2013, Serafini also released a deluxe, signed and numbered limited edition of 600 copies (300 in English and 300 in Italian).

Roland Barthes was interested in the Codex. In 1981 Italo Calvino wrote an essay on it, which can be found in Collezione di sabbia (Sand Collection) by Mondadori. The French choreographer Philippe Decouflé was inspired by it. Douglas Hofstadter wrote about it at length.

In a talk at the Oxford University Society of Bibliophiles held on 11 May 2009, Serafini stated that there is no meaning hidden behind the script of the Codex, which is asemic; that his own experience in writing it was closely similar to automatic writing; and that what he wanted his alphabet to convey to the reader is the sensation that children feel in front of books they cannot yet understand, although they see that their writing does make sense for grown-ups.

=== Other works ===
Pulcinellopedia

In 1984 Serafini illustrated Pulcinellopedia (piccola), under the pseudonym P. Cetrulo (published by Longanesi), with a suite of pencil drawings about the Neapolitan masque of Pulcinella. It was reprinted in 2016.

The catalogue from Serafini's Italian retrospective, Luna-Pac: Serafini, remains the only comprehensive publication of his oil paintings, drawings, sculptures, installations, and landscape art.

Serafini has also illustrated books, including an edition of Franz Kafka's story "In the Penal Colony" and a 1988 book entitled Etimologiario by Maria Sebregondi in the style similar to the Pulcinellopedia. In 2009 Serafini illustrated Le Storie Naturali, a reinterpretation of Les Histoires Naturelles (Nature Stories) by Jules Renard, published by Rizzoli in a signed, limited edition of 600. This book features numerous pockets containing leaves of fantastic plants printed on heavy paper stock and die-cut to leaf shape.

Other unpublished works and illustrations are reported to exist, but aside from the occasional exhibit of art (from clay figurines to plastic and polychrome sculpture to furniture and small installations), they are not available or publicly catalogued. Serafini started working on his own website, luigiserafini.com, in the mid-2000s but since 2009 it only shows a blank page.

=== Studio and home ===
Serafini's home in Rome is filled with his artwork, including hand painted walls and dozens of small-scale, surrealistic hybrid sculptures are in part realistic and in part phantasmagorical and perplexing. Due to gentrification of the neighborhood, the owner of the building wants all the tenants to move, so that it can be repurposed for the short-term rental market. This would entail the destruction of site-specific installations within the home. CBS News reported that a judge has put a temporary restriction on the eviction.
