= Arche-writing =

Concept in the philosophy of language

In the philosophy of language, "Arche-writing" (French: archi-écriture "arche-" meaning "origin, principle, or telos") is a concept introduced by French philosopher Jacques Derrida which refers to an abstract kind of writing that precedes both speech and actual writing. In the West, phonetic writing was considered as a secondary imitation of speech, a poor copy of the immediate living act of speech. Arche-writing is, in a sense, language, in that it is already there before we use it, it already has a pregiven, yet malleable, structure/genesis, which is a semi-fixed set-up of different words and syntax. This fixedness is the writing to which Derrida refers; such a 'writing' can even be seen in cultures that do not employ writing, it could be seen in notches on a rope or barrel, fixed customs, or placements around the living areas.

The concept of "arche-writing" generalizes writing beyond ink marks on paper. The idea is that many things, including spoken language, are in fact like writing, and thus could be called "arche-writing". Writing introduces a divide between what is intended to be meant and what is actually meant. Just like how writing causes such a divide, spoken language does so too. Even internal monologues and "private" thoughts are examples of arche-writing, and thus cannot have a fixed meaning.

In Derrida's essay Plato's Pharmacy, he sought to question this prioritising by firstly complicating the two terms speech and writing. According to Derrida, this complication is visible in the Greek word φάρμακον pharmakon, which meant both "cure" and "poison". Derrida argued that as far back as Plato, speech had been always given priority over writing. Derrida noted that Plato argued that writing was "poisonous" to memory, since writing is a mere repetition, as compared to the living memory required for speech. Derrida points out however, that since both speech and writing rely upon repetition they cannot be completely distinguished. Derrida argued that in later centuries philosopher Jean-Jacques Rousseau and linguist Ferdinand de Saussure both gave writing a secondary or parasitic role.
