= Oxford University Society of Bibliophiles =

Student society at the University of Oxford

- Founded: 1950; 76 years ago
- President: Pat Snidvongs

The Oxford University Society of Bibliophiles is a book collecting and bibliophile club run by students at the University of Oxford. It was originally founded in 1950 by a group of young bibliophiles, with the first meetings being held in Hilary term of 1951. For fifty years the Society held regular lectures, visits and other events during the University terms, and many of the leading bibliographers, librarians, book collectors, booksellers and other literary figures of the period spoke to the Society or hosted visits. Many of the Society's junior members went on to become prominent figures in the world of books, and some later served as senior members of the Society. One of the most influential members was John Sparrow, Warden of All Souls, who encouraged a love of books and manuscripts in a generation of students, and hosted a termly "Warden's Meeting" at which members were encouraged to bring items from their own libraries to pass round and say a few words about; the tradition of the "Warden's Meeting" continued after 1986, when the Warden himself was too ill to host the meetings and, indeed, after his death in 1992. Another of the Society's traditions was the quality of the termly programme cards, often produced by the leading printers and private presses of the age, including the Oxford and Cambridge University Presses, the Rampant Lions Press, the Samson Press, the Fantasy Press, the Kit-Cat Press, Big Wheel Press, the Perpetua Press, the Incline Press, the Whittington Press, the Libanus Press, the Rocket Press, the Stanbrook Abbey Press and the Stamperia Valdonega.

After a period of difficulties and disrupted activities in the last decade of the twentieth century, the Society closed in 2000, when interest among the students had declined so far that a junior committee could no longer be formed. However, due to the efforts of a new generation of Oxford students led by Geri Della Rocca de Candal, Enrico Emanuele Prodi and Matthew Cheung Salisbury, aided by Cristina Dondi, Richard Ovenden and a few surviving members of the former Society (notably Colin Franklin and Paul W. Nash), the Oxford University Society of Bibliophiles was refounded in Trinity term 2008 and became fully active in Michaelmas term in the same year. The first termcard for the new Society was printed by the Rampant Lions Press (and was among the last jobs printed by Sebastian Carter).

The Society's device was designed by Michael Harvey.

== Sources ==
- Davies, Evan (1977). The Warden's meeting: a tribute to John Sparrow. Oxford: Society of Bibliophiles.
- Nash, Paul W.; Howes, Justin (2006). Bibliophiles at Oxford: a celebration of fifty years of the Oxford University Society of Bibliophiles, 1951–2000, with descriptive notes on the term cards. Witney: Society of Bibliophiles.
