= Lico Fang =

Chinese curator, cultural journalist and producer

- Born: 1976 (age 49–50); Wuhan
- Education: CCNU, Wuhan, China
- Known for: TAIFUN Project
- Notable work: PLUS – A Project for an Aging World
- Website: taifunproject.org

Lico Fang (* 1976 as Fang Li in Wuhan, China) is a Chinese curator, cultural journalist and producer, as well as founder and director of the nonprofit organization TAIFUN Project e.V. Since 2013, she has been living in Düsseldorf.

== Training and background ==
Lico Fang grew up in Wuhan. She studied literature at CCNU (Central China Normal University) in Wuhan. From 1999 to 2011, Fang worked as an author and cultural journalist in Tokyo. During this time, she wrote for various journals and magazines, such as the Architectural Society of China's "A+a" (Architecture & art) magazine, Modern Weekly, Life Week's art section, as well as GQ, Surface and Vision. In 2011, Fang returned to China and took a position as planning director at Crystal CG in Beijing. In 2013, she left Crystal CG and moved to Düsseldorf, Germany, where she began working as a freelance curator. In 2016, she brought to life the international art platform TAIFUN Project.

== Taifun Project ==
With Taifun Project, Lico Fang and co-founder Marc Franz develop and realize artistic projects with different social and artistic issues. The aim is to "connect voices from different fields of society, in order to initiate dialogues and debates with social, scientific, artistic and cultural-political relevance." In collaborating with national and international partners, they engage in cross-disciplinary projects. Taifun project's activities range "from artistic research programs, artist residencies and interdisciplinary forums to exhibitions, symposia and cross-disciplinary art events, as well as its own productions, for example virtual 360° tours, film or book productions."

== Selected exhibitions, projects and productions ==
- Public Sphere, Beijing Design Week, 2012
- Eurasia: Picturing a New Map (ACS#1), together with Asian Culture Sequence (ACS), Düsseldorf, 2016

with TAIFUN Project

- Offset – works of media artist Shi Zheng, Düsseldorf, 2016
- Supervention – works of Düsseldorf-based artist Michalis Nicolaides, Beijing, 2017
- A Night With The Tiger – discussion evening with Tian Gebing from Paper Tiger Theater Studio and artists from the independent scene in North Rhine-Westphalia, Weltkunstzimmer Düsseldorf, 2017
- Beijing Intervention – works of Düsseldorf-based artist Christine Erhard, Institute for Provocation, Beijing, 2018
- What We Talk About When We Talk About Residence – works of Yingmei Duan, Juergen Staack und Michal Martychowiec, Neuss, 2018
- Residenz Niederrhein – An Artistic Research Project, 2018
  - Xiao Ke & Zi Han, Chiname – A Performance Project (Work in Progress), performance and talk, Weltkunstzimmer Düsseldorf
  - Huang Jing Yuan, A Map Against the World, Weltkunstzimmer, Düsseldorf
  - Tong Mo, A Gift Without Receiver, reading and talk, Weltkunstzimmer, Düsseldorf
  - Xiao Ke & Zi Han, Chiname, performance and exhibition, Roepaen, Gennep, Netherlands
  - Huang Jing Yuan, What Am I Missing? Ways to the Community, Exhibition, Museum Kunstraum, Neuss
  - Tong Mo, The New Continent in the Medicine Tower, performance and reading, Mühlenturm, Geldern
- In the Mirror of the Other I, screening (Beyond Boundaries, a documentary film by Louis Spoelstra), exhibition and discussion, Goethe Institute Shanghai, 2018
- In the Mirror of the Other II, talk with the literary translator Karin Betz, Leipzig Book Fair, 2019
- Beyond Boundaries, screening, Hitch Cinema, Neuss, 2019
- Benefit for Artists – Solidarity Art Initiative in Support of Artists, digital, 2020
- Plus – A Project for an Aging World, interdisciplinary German-Japanese project on the topic of age(ing), Germany and Japan, 2021–2022
  - Time Shifts – Age(ing) and Society, symposium, Palais Wittgenstein, Düsseldorf, 2021
  - Time Shifts, group performance and exhibition, Düsseldorf, 2021
- Benefit for Artists – Solidarity Art Initiative in Support of Artists, digital, 2021
- My Bones Beat the Drum, scenic reading and discussion, Düsseldorf, 2022
- Plus – A Project for an Aging World | Japan, Ibaraki City, Osaka, Japan, 2022
