= Centre des livres d'artistes =

French art collection and gallery

- Location of the Centre des livres d'artistes France
- Established: 1994
- Location: 1 Place Attane, 87500; Saint-Yrieix-la-Perche, France
- Coordinates: 45°30′55.536″N 1°12′8.367″E
- Type: Artist's book collection and gallery
- Director: 1999 - 2026 : Didier Mathieu 2026 - : Alex Chevalier
- Website: cdla.info

The Centre des livres d'artistes - CDLA (Center for Artist's Books) is a regional institution dedicated to the artist's book since 1994 in Limousin, located in Saint-Yrieix-la-Perche, 40 km southwest of Limoges

== Mission ==
The Centre des livres d'artistes serves both as a repository for a significant collection of artist's books in terms of quantity and quality, as well as an exhibition space. It is the only place in France that permanently showcases this type of publication.

Since 2005, the CDLA has been located in a building in the historic center of the city, with three exhibition rooms, a space for the presentation of videos and audio documents, a storage area for the collection, a room for educational activities, and offices. Additionally, the Centre des livres d'artistes hosts artist residencies.

== History ==
The CDLA's origins trace back to the First Biennial for Artist's Books, held in collaboration with the city of Uzerche in 1989 through the partnership of the Pays-Paysage association founded by artist Henri Cueco in 1979. Over twelve editions, this biennial led to the creation of multiple catalogs.

The CDLA is led by Didier Mathieu, who is also the founder of the Sixtus publishing house.

== Exhibitions ==
The CDLA hosts up to four exhibitions per year featuring renowned international artists. Recently Pol Bury (2022), Carolee Schneemann (2020), Crass (2018), Herman de Vries (2015). An array of events, including artist talks, lectures, and expert panel discussions, highlight various aspects of artist's book practices.

== Collections ==
As the third-largest collection in France in terms of both scale and quality (after the Bibliothèque Nationale de France and the Bibliothèque Kandinsky – Center Pompidou), the Centre des livres d'artistes collection currently comprises around 6000 works, encompassing books, magazines, posters, prints, postcards, CDs, and DVDs. This compilation represents 600 French and international artists. The collection boasts significant holdings, including an early 1960s Fluxus document collection, a vast assortment of publications by Dutch artist Herman de Vries (France's largest collection), an international concrete poetry compilation, and approximately thirty substantial sets dedicated to influential French and foreign artists who play a key role in the ongoing history of artist's books (Eleanor Antin, Ida Applebroog, Irma Blank, Barbara Bloom, Alighiero Boetti, Marinus Boezem, Christian Boltanski, Ulises Carrión, Claude Closky, Hanne Darboven, Mirtha Dermisache, Hamish Fulton, Richard Long, Annette Messager, Olaf Nicolai, Richard Nonas, Maria Nordman, Martha Rosler, Dieter Roth, Claude Rutault, Ben Vautier, Lawrence Weiner...).

== Publications (selection) ==
The CDLA regularly produces artist's books, essays, monographic catalogs, and exhibition catalogs.

- 2005: Herman de Vries Les livres et les publications – Catalogue raisonné (+ CD-ROM), ISBN 978-2-9512638-3-3
- 2008: Mirtha Dermisache, Libro n° 2: 1972, ISBN 978-2-917824-01-6
- 2011: Claude Rutault, AMZ ou "le soleil brille pour tout le monde" dé-finition /méthode 169. 1985-87, ISBN 978-2-917393-01-7
- 2012: Bernard Marcadé, Paul-Armand Gette, Djamel Meskache, Paul-Armand Gette ? Un goût certain pour la publication, ISBN 978-2-917393-02-4
- 2015: Peter Downsbrough, Then Set, ISBN 978-2-917393-05-5
- 2017: Claude Closky, Iluo, ISBN 978-2-917393-08-6
- 2020: Elsa Werth, Un jour dans Le Monde (4 octobre 2019), ISBN 978-2-917393-11-6
