= Archive for Small Press & Communication =

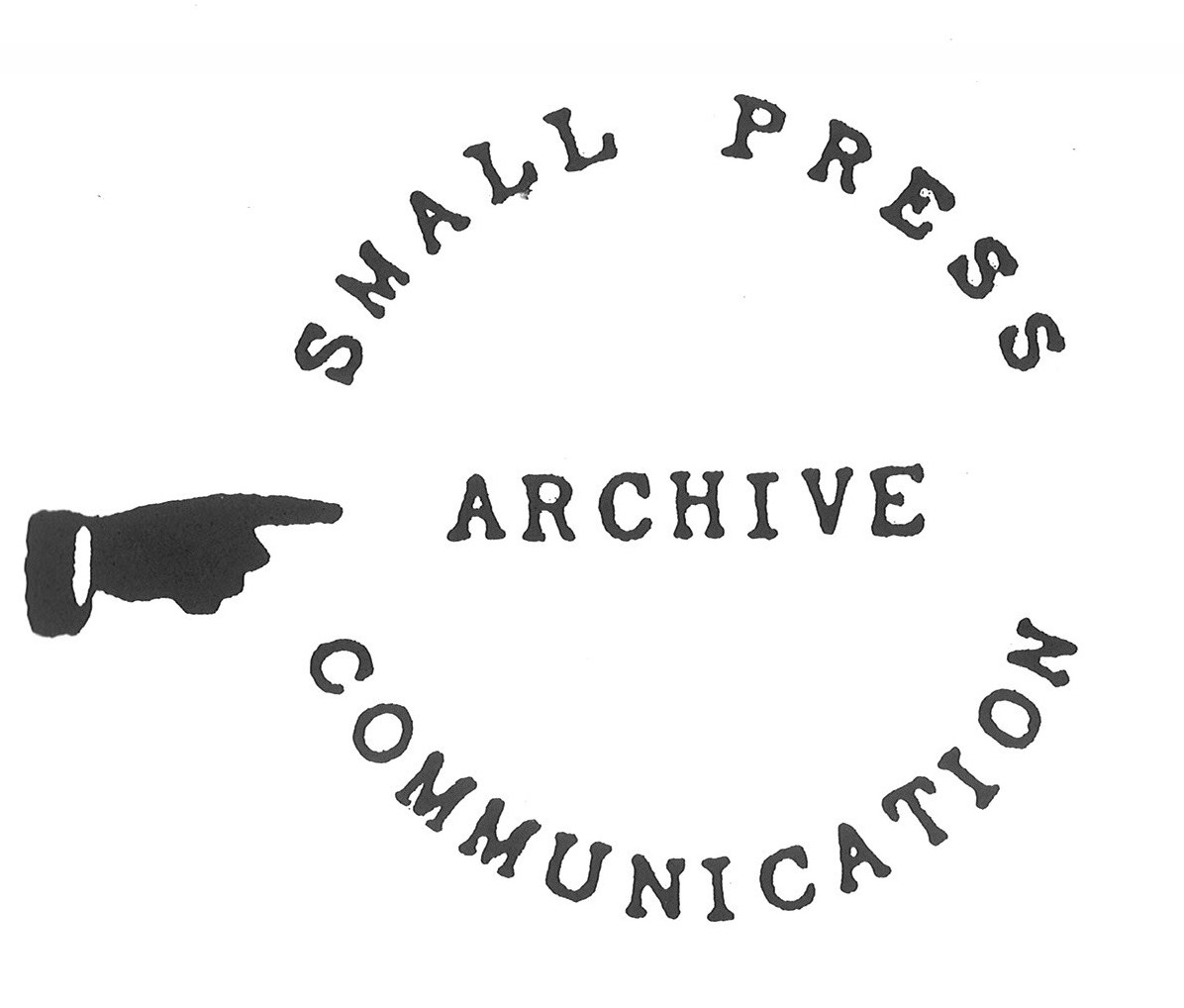
ASPC logo

The Archive for Small Press & Communication (A.S.P.C. or ASPC) was founded in 1974 by Guy Schraenen and Anne Marsily in Antwerp, Belgium. It was part of the international network of the small press ( often used interchangeably with "indie publisher", and "independent press") movements of this period. In fact the A.S.P.C. was a development of the former activities in Guy Schraenen's Galerie Kontakt (1966–1978) and their publishing house Guy Schraenen éditeur (1973–1978).

== The Fund and the Activities of the Archive ==
"The Archive for Small Press & Communication (A.S.P.C) has the aim to collect and preserve all types of art documentation, emanating principally from artists’ initiatives and covering all fields the contemporary artist is active in." (Guy Schraenen)

The A.S.P.C covers all fields of the contemporary art and had the aim to collect and preserve all types of art documentations emanating principally from artists’ initiatives. As most of the collected documents record activities neglected by the traditional artworld, the preserved works remain an important contribution to the knowledge of the contemporary art scene until the 1980s. In the view of this fact the A.S.P.C. is as well an artistic as a political statement. Paul de Vree wrote about it:

“It is thanks to the ‘Small Press’ that not only the avant-garde but also the pluralism of ideas and action have found their way into the rigid world of conformism.”

The collection consists publications, ranging from the avantgarde of the 1920s. The main focus are the tendencies of the 1960s to the 1980s such as Conceptual Art, Fluxus, Land Art, Minimalism, Pop Art, Concrete Poetry, Sound Poetry, Sound Art, Mail Art. In this field the Archive conserved visual, sound and text works. They are divided in several sections such as Artist's Books, Records and Cassettes, Posters, Film and Video Art, Catalogues, Multiples, Magazines, Postcards, Photographs, Writings by Artists and Original Works. All together it is a fund of thousands of documents representing the works of several hundreds of artists from over 25 countries. Many of them are meanwhile recognized by a larger public such as Ben, Christian Boltanski, Marcel Broodthaers, Daniel Buren, James Lee Byars, John Cage, Ulises Carrión, Henri Chopin, Mirtha Dermisache, Hanne Darboven, Robert Filliou, Dan Graham, Sol LeWitt, Richard Long, Roman Opalka, Dieter Roth, Daniel Spoerri, Timm Ulrichs, Bernard Villers, Andy Warhol, Lawrence Weiner. Next to the collection of publications, works, documents and bio-bibliographical publications the A.S.P.C. also published publications and had an uninterrupted activity in showing exhibitions in its own exhibition space (“ARCHIVE SPACE”) and travelling exhibitions, in producing a monthly radio programme (“I AM AN ARTIST”) and in organizing lectures and symposiums. All this happened on individual base and in collaboration with artists’ run spaces, museums or cultural centers. 1999 a museum took note of the A.S.P.C. and Guy Schraenen was encharged to build up a collection of artists' books in the Neues Museum Weserburg in Bremen (Germany). This step was of great importance:

"Never before artists' books were regarded as art works and presented equally alongside paintings, sculptures, graphics, environments and installations in a museum"

In 1999 the A.S.P.C. collection was acquired by the Neues Museum Weserburg (NMWB), Bremen (Germany). It forms the cadre of the Research Centre of Artists' Publications in this museum, initiated by Anne Thurmann-Jajes. Its task is the scientific research on artists' publications. Already before, on invitation of Thomas Deecke (founder and director of the Neues Museum Weserburg), Guy Schraenen was responsible for the collection of artist's books and more than 25 thematic and solo exhibitions in this museum. Since 2000 the fund of the A.S.P.C. is presented in several international exhibitions such as “Out of print” (2001), “Vinyl” (2005), “Un coup de livre” (2010), “From Page to Space” (2011) etc.
