= Guy Schraenen =

Guy Schraenen (born 5 May 1941 in London, England – died 9 November 2018 in Paris, France) was a curator and publisher that founded the Gallery Kontakt in Antwerp, the publishing house Guy Schraenen éditeur and the Archive for Small Press & Communication (A.S.P.C.). He also authored several publications on international avant-garde and independent art movements from the late 1950s until the 1980s.

== Biography ==
=== Galerie Kontakt ===
In 1965 Schraenen opened the Galerie Kontakt in Antwerp, which he ran until 1978. The gallery initially displayed lyrical abstraction and constructivist works. It transitioned into displaying avant-garde movements such as visual poetry, sound poetry, sound art, conceptual art, Fluxus, mail art and artists' books.

=== Guy Schraenen éditeur ===
In 1973, the idea of reaching wider audiences he established the publishing house Guy Schraenen éditeur. It had its origins in Antwerp, but an equivalent number of close collaborations with artists took place in Paris. It was important to Schraenen to release image-based artworks as well as those that incorporated text, and also sound. Until 1978, he published artists' books as well as magazines, catalogues, ephemera, postcards, multiples, posters, compact cassettes, records and films by artists. by artists.

=== Archive for Small Press & Communication ===
Like other art publications, Guy Schraenen éditeur publications did not have a great commercial impact. Artists of the time were showing their work beyond the traditional boundaries of commercial galleries to circumvent the established art system during the 1960s and 1970s. Within this context, artists' publications by Schraenen's publishing house gave rise to the project Archive for Small Press & Communication (A.S.P.C.) (Antwerp, Belgium) which he ran together with Anne Marsily from 1974 on.

The purpose of the archive was "...to collect and preserve all types of art documentation." Accordingly, the archive collected a broad spectrum of artists' printed publications, and also sound art which were made available to the public. In order to ensure this mission, exhibitions, performances, screenings, and lectures were held at the Galerie Kontakt and later at the Archive Space. Schrawnen's radio program I am an Artist served the same purpose. Some of these events were organized in collaboration with artists, other galleriess, museums and cultural centres in numerous European countries. Relationships were also forged in Latin America. The Polish artist Józef Robakowski commented Schraenen's engagement in Poland in the 1970s: "Our contacts were broken mechanically. Letters were controlled and all parcels destroyed. But soon Guy Schraenen from Antwerp, an independent publisher, helped us and started to cooperate with us very actively. This contact was extremly [sic] helpful as far as the exchange of information beyond official, institutionalized channels was concerned."

Schraenen considered the Archive for Small Press & Communication as an artistic concept as well as a political statement.

In 1989, Schraenen became the founding curator of A Museum within a Museum within the Museum Weserburg Bremen. It functions as a gallery of artists books, similar to print collection in a traditional art museum.

In 1999, the archive of 50,000 items was acquired by the Museum Weserburg in collaboration with the University of Bremen, known as the Research Centre for Artists' Publications. The Sound Art section includes nearly 1000 artists records, audio CDs and audio cassettes including printed matter, documentation and ephemera. There is also a bibliographic department that was acquired by the same institution in 2017.

Since the 1990s, Schraenen was responsible for the collections and exhibitions of artists' publications at the Museo Nacional Centro de Arte Reina Sofía in Madrid, the Fundação de Serralves in Porto, the Museu d'Art Contemporani de Barcelona (MACBA), the International Centre of Graphic Arts, Ljubljana (MGLC) and other institutions.

== Exhibitions and catalogues selection ==
=== Solo exhibitions ===
- Ulises Carrión. We have won, haven't we? (1992: Amsterdam)
- Dieter Roth. Gesammelte Werke u.a. (1992: Bremen)
- Henri Chopin. Revue OU, Collection OU (1993: Bremen)
- Peter Downsbrough. Books (1993: Bremen)
- Richard Long. Step by step, page by pag (1993: Bremen, Porto)
- Sol LeWitt. Systems in book form (1994: Bremen)
- James Lee Byars. Perfect is my death world (1995: Bremen, Krems)
- Brion Gysin. Dream machine (1995: Bremen)
- Christian Boltanski. Inventar of all books published between 1969 and 1995, drawn up by G.S. (1996: Bremen, Köln, Budapest)
- Marcel Broothaers. poetry and/or art (1997: Bremen)
- Ben (Vautier). Books-magazines-invitations-posters (1998: Bremen)
- Daniel Buren. Coloured and multiple impressions (1999: Bremen)
- Hans Peter Feldmann. Bücher (1999: Bremen)
- Ernst Caramelle. All the printed matter 1974-2004 (2005: Porto, Karlsruhe, Insbruck)
- François Dufrêne (2007: Porto)
- Nemo propheta in patria. Cavellini und andere Projekte (2014: Bremen)
- Dear Reader. Don't Read. Retrospective Ulises Carrión (2016: Madrid, 2017: Mexico City)

=== Thematical exhibitions ===
- Text-Sound-Image. Small Press Festival (1976: Antwerp, Brussels, Ghent)
- Editions & Communications Marginales d'Amerique Latine (1976: Le Havre)
- International Mail Art Festival (1980: Antwerp)
- Poolse Avant-Garde (1985: Antwerp)
- Kunst-enaars-publicaties (1988, Ghent)
- Multiples and other multiples (1991: Leuven, Turnhout)
- Metamorphoses of writing (1994: Bremen)
- Erratum Musical (1994: Karlsruhe, Edinburg, Munich, Bremen)
- Two houses - Le Corbusier/Melnikow (1995: Moscow)
- D'une oeuvre l'autre (1996: Mariemont)
- Out of Print. An archive as artistic concept (since 2001: Bremen, Zürich, Porto, Barcelona, Paris, Ljubljana, Erlangen)
- Vinyl. Records and covers by artists (since 2005: Barcelona, Bremen, Porto, Paris, Moscow, etc.)
- On the margins of art. Creation and political engagement (2009: MACBA Barcelona, Porto)
- Una tirada de libros (2010: Madrid, Palma de Mallorca)
- From Page to Space (2011: Porto, Bremen, Düren, Murska-Sobota)
- Journey to the end of colour: Books and prints (2013, Museum Serralves Porto)
- It is not new, it is a book (2014/15: Museo Nacional Centro de Arte Reina Sofía, Madrid)
- I call them simply books (2015: Museo Nacional Centro de Arte Reina Sofía, Madrid)
- More than a catalogue. The catalogue-boxes of the Museum Abteiberg-Mönchengladbach (2016: Museo Nacional Centro de Arte Reina Sofía, Madrid)

== Further watching ==
- Lecture by Guy Schraenen (2006), held at the CIMAM Conference, London: http://www.cimam.org/arxius/reuniones/videos/dsp_video.php?id_video=13_01
- Guy Schraenen about the exhibition of his Sound Collection: Vinyl : records and covers by artists (2010) at La Maison Rouge, Paris (in French): https://www.youtube.com/watch?v=PGKs6N1t4co
- O Livros de artista (2012). Fundação de Serralves, Porto: https://www.youtube.com/watch?v=xxBdN8K86oU
- Livre ouvert. A film for Artists' books and photography at Paris Photo (2014), showing a.o. Encoconnage, Guy Schraenen éditeur, 1974: https://www.youtube.com/watch?v=RCw3CWy3e_c
- Guy Schraenen about the Ulises Carrión retrospective Dear Reader. Don't Read at Museo Nacional Centro de Arte Reina Sofía, Madrid (2016): https://vimeo.com/159767487
