= ASPC =

ASPC may refer to:

- Alejandro Silva (musician)
- American Society for Preventive Cardiology
- Archive for Small Press & Communication
- Associated Students of Pomona College
