= Mirtha Dermisache =

Argentine artist (1940–2012)

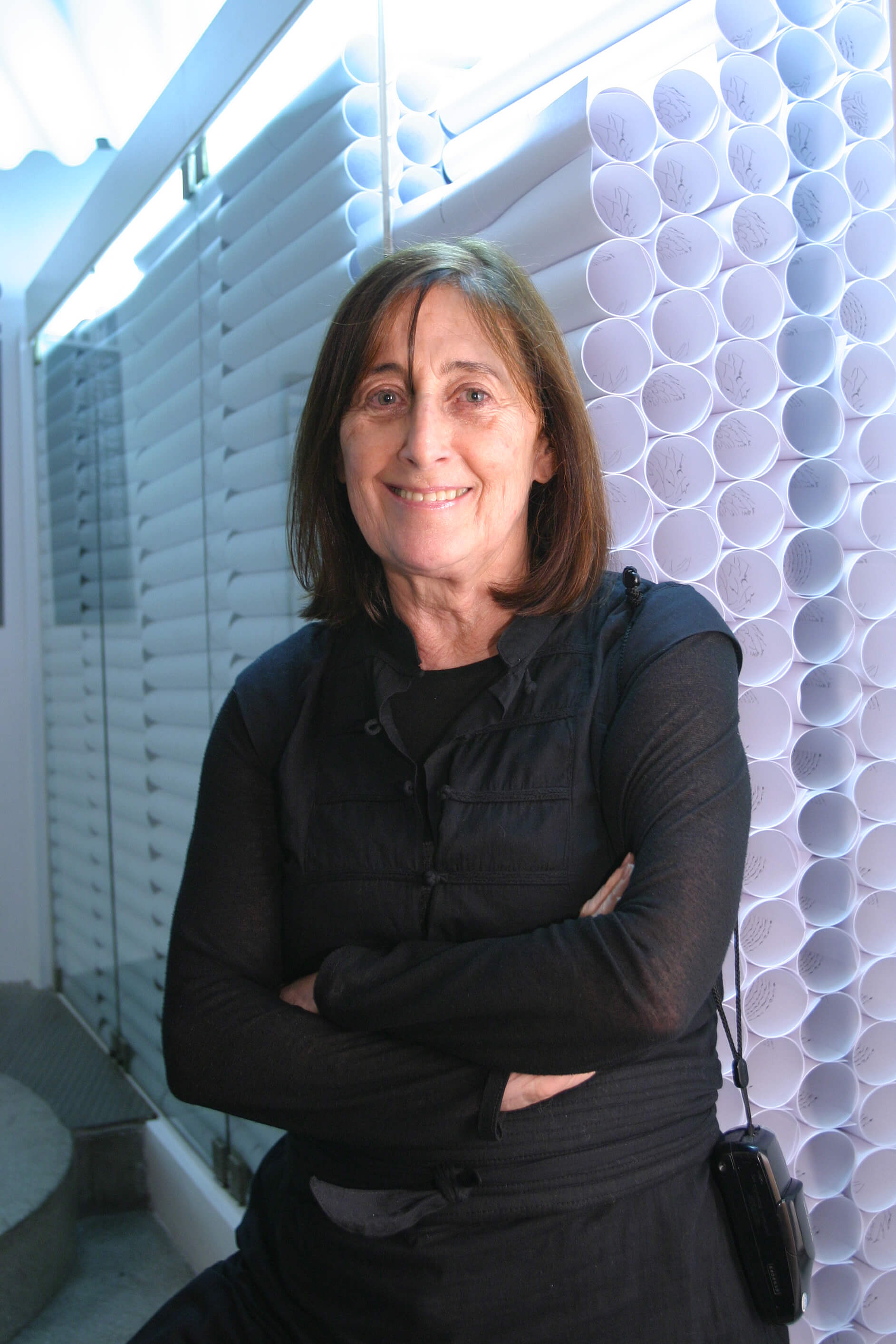
- Dermisache in 2010
- Born: February 21, 1940; Buenos Aires, Argentina
- Died: January 5, 2012 (aged 71)
- Education: Manuel Belgrano and Prilidiano Pueyrredón National Schools of Fine Arts
- Known for: Asemic writing
- Website: Archivo Mirtha Dermisache

Mirtha Dermisache (21 February 1940 – 5 January 2012) was an Argentine artist whose works of asemic writing have been published and exhibited internationally at venues including the Centre Georges Pompidou in Paris and MACBA in Barcelona, and collected by leading international arts institutions. She won the Konex Award in 2012 (posthumous) in Concept Art.

== Early life and education ==
Dermisache was born in Buenos Aires, Argentina. She studied visual arts at the Manuel Belgrano and Prilidiano Pueyrredón National Schools of Fine Arts.

== Career ==
Dermisache published her first 500-page book in 1966–1967. In the 1970s, Dermisache's works were published in Latin America and Europe by the Centre of Art and Communication (CayC), led by Jorge Glusberg. From the mid-1970s through the 1980s, Marc Dachy Guy Schraenen, Belgian editor and curator, also published and exhibited her works through the Archive for Small Press and Communication. Her works were also published in the magazines Flash Art, Doc(k)s, Kontext, Ephemera and Ax. Ulises Carrión exhibited her works in the gallery Other Books and So (Amsterdam), and Roberto Altmann did the same in the Malmö Konsthall (Sweden). Her first solo show in Buenos Aires was in the gallery "The Edge".

Since 2004, Mirtha Dermisache together with Florent Fajole, a French publisher, made a series of publisher's devices exploring the dimensions of installation and publishing, which have been presented in Buenos Aires, Paris, London, Rome, and New York. In The Paris Review, critic Will Fenstermaker wrote of her works: "Dermisache’s asemic writings are theurgic: they are ritualistic marks meant to heal one’s relationship to a universal presence. They take little interest in expressing the singular vision of the author and artist. They undermine the notion that the end state of an author is to be published, an artist to be framed."

In 1971, she created the Workshop of Creative Actions in Buenos Aires where she imparted her visual arts teaching method. Between 1974 and 1981, she gave a cycle of public workshops named Colour and Form Conferences where she exposed her method: "How to develop creative skills by means of artistic techniques."

She had exhibited in the Proa Foundation, the Fine Arts Pavilion at the Argentine Catholic University (UCA), at the MACBA, Spain, at the Centre Pompidou where on the occasion of her recent incorporation in the collection she was part of the exhibition collection elles @ centrepompidou, and in different institutional spaces in France, like the Centre Des Livres d’Artistes and the Belfort School of Fine Arts Pavilion. Her latest group exhibition, Alfabeti della mente, dedicated to the issue of illegible writing, took place in gallery P420, in Bologna, Italy, along with artists such as León Ferrari, Hanne Darboven, Irma Blank and Dadamaino.
