= Max de Esteban =

Spanish photographer

Max de Esteban is an artist working mostly in photography and video whose work is best known for his examination of the human condition under a technological regime.

His projects have been exhibited at museums and institutions including NRW-Forum in Dusseldorf, Museum of Fine Arts Houston, XIII Bienal de La Habana, Deutsche Technik Museum in Berlin, Virreina Centre de l’Imatge in Barcelona, XIII Cairo Biennale, XVI Cuenca Biennale, CGAC in Santiago de Compostela, Staatliche Museum für Fotografie in Berlin and Palais de Tokyo in Paris.

His work has been the subject of four monographs: Twenty Red Lights (La Fábrica, 2017); Propositions (La Fabrica, 2015); Heads will Roll (Hatje Cantz, 2014) and Elegies of Manumission (Nazraeli, 2012) and is part of museums’ collections such as Museum of Fine Arts Houston, Staatliche Museen–Museum für Fotografie in Berlin, MACBA in Barcelona, Museu de Arte Moderna do Rio de Janeiro, SEDF in Bratislava, Deutsche Technik Museum in Berlin and Wifredo Lam in La Habana.

De Esteban holds a BsC in Engineering from Universidad Politécnica de Cataluña, an MBA from Stanford University and a PhD in Economics and Business from Ramon Llull University. He is a Fulbright Alumnus.

De Esteban's work is organized in three distinct bodies: Elegies of Manumission, Propositions and Infrastructures of Modernity.

== Elegies of Manumission and Propositions ==
Elegies of Manumission, produced between 2009 and 2011, raises social and political questions through symbolic portraiture. Challenging post-modernist visuality, the artist proposes an expressionistic photography. Counterposing the cool, detached individual prototypical of post-modernity, De Esteban presents the baroque, hybrid and de-centered contemporary personality. The series was published as a monograph by Nazraeli Press and was exhibited in Fotofestiwal in Poland, where was awarded with the Jury's Special Award (2010), and in the Center of European Photography in Bratislava (2012), among many others.

Propositions, initiated in 2011, deal with contemporary art and political issues reflecting upon the human condition under a technological totality. What all the Propositions series have in common is the effort to critically assess contemporaneity through the exploration of technology and photography’s ability to renew its symbolic potency. As the artist recently said: "We are living extraordinary times. And fighting for the renewal of photography’s iconic force is to fight against the temporality of a capitalist economy that erases the past and, by doing so, eliminates our instruments for critique."

The series that belong to it are: Only the Ephemeral, The Collection, Touch me Not, Heads will Roll, Binary Code and, the latest still in process, Elements of Geometry.

Propositions pose uncomfortable questions. In Proposition One, translucent X-ray images magnify mechanical devices that have become outdated, although they continue to function perfectly according to their purpose. In Proposition Three, de Esteban examines the cold, gray inner life of cell phones or tablets and the increasing enmeshment of the body and digital technology.

In Heads Will Roll, Proposition number four of the series, he uses seductive photo collages made of film stills, flower photos, and fragments of text to convey the essence of the parameters that are penetrated by the postmodern patchwork of our lives. The media define everyday life: we are permanently made to feel insecure by the wars and disasters that are always happening in the world; the individual is in danger of drowning in the masses; genuine and fake have become almost indistinguishable; and a vague fear of the East pervades political policy. Reality is largely conveyed as a media experience. Heads will Roll was listed as a photobook of the year by LensCulture magazine; its New York exhibition was shown on the cover of Photograph Magazine in its September–October, 2015 issue (Volume 13, Number 1); and Artslant said it was a "must see exhibitions in North America"

Propositions next project was Binary Code (2015), a series that deals with the symbolic end of humanism and its relation to digital materiality. Binary Code has been exhibited in Mirbach Palais in Bratislava in 2017, Pingyao International Photography Festival in 2017 and Klompching Gallery in New York in 2018.

== Infrastructures of Contemporaneity ==
In 2016, and in parallel with Propositions, Max de Esteban engaged in a second long-term project under the concept of Infrastructures of Contemporaneity. As the 20th century cannot be understood without taking into account the "infrastructures" that made it possible, De Esteban long-term project pretends to identify those that will be key in the understanding of the 21st century and unveil their ideological nature. For the purpose of the project, infrastructures are defined as "the key technologies, systems and physical conditions that enable the circulation of meaning and power".

The first series of the project is Twenty Red Lights (2016). Its objective is to unveil the implications of economy’s digital financialization and its relation to the radicalized neoliberal agenda. Finance is the key technology for the allocation of economic resources and as such, is the infrastructure that determines capitalism’s priorities. Deciding on the allocation of investment implies governing the frontiers of research and innovation, it means constructing the future. Financial capitalism should be the proper place to start any critical assessment of contemporaneity. Twenty Red Lights consists of a video and three series of 20 photographs each. It also includes a book published by La Virreina/La Fabrica with essays by Franco Bifo Berardi and Michel Feher. This project has been exhibited in La Virreina Centre de L'Imatge (2018), XIII La Habana Biennale (2019) and CGAC- Centro Gallego de Arte Contemporánea (2019). A selection was also included in the Yokohama Triennale 2020, curated by Raqs Media Collective.

The second series of this ongoing project is A Forest (2018). A Forest reflects upon the implications of Artificial Intelligence technology and the ideological frameworks under which it operates. Its focus is not the technology itself or its aesthetic imaginary, instead it is the exploration of the social values at stake due to the potential dominance of this digital infrastructure and the ideology behind its leading investors. The series consists of a video and 21 photographs. It was exhibited at the XIII Cairo Biennale in 2019, and in the 10th room of MUAC in Mexico City.

The third series is White Noise (2020), and explores the implications of extinction. In a world under environmental risk, the premature extinction of humans is a plausible scenario. A major catastrophe, such as a nuclear crisis, or a chain of smaller events that could go unnoticed until too late could be the cause. White noise, the first video of the series, combines texts in English and Latin from Ovid's Metamorphosis with warnings from Earth to Capitalism about the end of the world if the glut continues. A group of photographs also fantasizes about the nonexistence of colors in a world without humans.

Black book (2021) is the fourth and, for the time being, the last series of the project. It focuses on the inequalities of capitalism, and the imperfect tools that Western society has developed to counter its effects. The 17-minute black and white animation video, tells the story of Pepe, an unscrupulous lawyer that creates a complex web to avoid taxation in an international operation. The lack of ethics of a whole system created in order to allow big corporations to skip contributing to social progress is revealed. The Oxfam photo series shows a list of nations, some of them well respected in the global scene, that act as tax havens. They are presented as viruses that infect a body.

== Publications ==
=== Publications by de Esteban ===
- Elegies of Manumission. USA: Nazraeli Press, 2012. ISBN 978-1-59005-337-9
- Heads will Roll. Spicer House Editions, 2013. ISBN 8461626362
- Heads will Roll. Germany: Hatje Cantz, 2014 ISBN 978-3-7757-3899-6
- Propositions. Madrid: La Fábrica, 2015. ISBN 978-84-16248-12-4
- Twenty Red Lights. Barcelona: la Virreina-La Fábrica, 2017. ISBN 978-84-17048-30-3
- Estética de la Extinción. Madrid: Editorial Turner, 2022. ISBN 978-84-18895-31-9

=== Publication with contribution by de Esteban ===
- Dictionary of Spanish photographers from XIX to XXI century. Madrid: La Fábrica, 2014. ISBN 978-84-15691-09-9
- Bauhaus und die Fotografie, Kerber, Germany, 2019. ISBN 978-3-7356-0547-4

== Exhibitions ==
=== Solo exhibitions (selection) ===
- Fotofestiwal, Vertige. Lodz, Poland, 2010
- Central European House of Photography, Elegies. Bratislava, Slovakia, 2012
- Festival de la Luz, Proposition One, Buenos Aires. Argentina, 2102
- Uno Art Space, Propositions, Stuttgart, Germany, 2013
- PhotoVisa Festival of Photography, Heads will Roll, Krasnodar, Russia, 2014
- Deutsche Technik Museum, Vom Vergehen. Berlin, Germany, 2015
- La Fabrica, Heads will Roll, Madrid, Spain, 2016
- XVI Fotofest Biennial, Heads will Roll, Houston, TX, 2016
- Gallery NoW, Heads will Roll, Seoul, Korea, 2016
- Center for Fine Art Photography, "Heads will Roll", Fort Collins, USA 2017
- European Month of Photography, Mirbach Palais, "Binary Code", Bratislava, Slovakia 2017
- Art Galerie, Heads will Roll, Siegen, Germany
- Uno Art, Heads will Roll, Stuttgart, Germany
- Pingyao International Photography Festival, Binary Code, China
- La Virreina Centre de L' Imatge, "Twenty Red Lights", Barcelona, Spain 2018
- XIII Cairo Biennale. A Forest. Egypt 2019
- XIII Bienal de La Habana, Twenty Red Lights, Cuba 2019
- CGAC – Centro Gallego de Arte Contemporánea, Twenty Red Lights, Spain 2019
- Yokohama Triennale, Afterglow, Yokohama, Japan, 2020
- MUAC – Museo Universitario Arte Contemporáneo, Sala 10, A Forest, D.F., Mexico, 2021

=== Group exhibitions ===
- Museum of Fine Arts Houston, Photo Forum, USA, 2012
- Rencontres Internationales, Palais de Tokyo, Paris, 2012
- Rencontres Internationales, Haus der Kulturen der Welt, Berlin, 2013
- Videos FestFoto, Proposition Two, Porto Alegre, Brazil, 2014
- Darmstädter Tage der Fotografie, Darmstadt, Germany, 2014
- Institute of Contemporary Art, Relics, San Jose, USA, 2015
- Künstlerhaus Bethanien, You & Me, Berlin, Germany, 2018
- Museum of Photography, Berlin; Germany 2019
- Kunsthalle Darmstadt, On New Vision In Contemporary Art, Darmstadt, Germany 2019
- Jeu de Paume, Le Supermarché des images, Paris, France 2020
- Noyes Museum, Digital Practices in Changing Times, Atlantic City, USA, 2021
- Red Brick Art Museum, Le Supermarché des images, Beijing, China 2021

== Awards ==
- Grand Prix Jury's Special Award, Fotofestiwal 2010, Poland
- National Award of Professional Photography, 2010, Spain
- Rencontres Internationales 2012, Paris/Berlin/Madrid
- Welde Kunstpreis, 2013, nominated, Germany
- Gallery NoW Artist Award, 2014, Korea
- LensCulture, 2014 photo-books of the year, for Heads will Roll
