= Ràdio Web MACBA =

Online radio with a podcast service

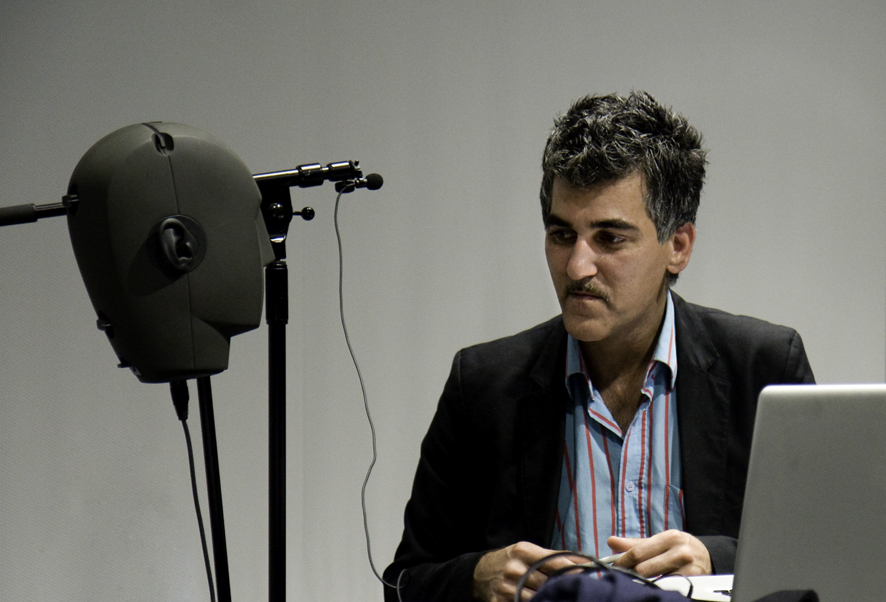
Mark Gergis during an interview at Ràdio Web MACBA

Ràdio Web MACBA, also known as RWM, is an online radio with a podcast subscription service, which explores contemporary thought, experimental music, radiophonic art, and sound art. It is a MACBA project. RWM is a tool that serves to document the continuous present of the Museum, including interviews with many of the prominent figures that pass through the Centre, who have so far included Michel Feher, Mark Fisher, Franco Berardi, Ann Demeester, Judith Butler, Rick Prelinger, Suely Rolnik, Philippe Méaille, Michael Baldwin, Mel Ramsden, Allan Sekula, Seth Siegelaub, Kenneth Goldsmith, Ramon Amaro, Naeem Mohaiemen Fareed Armaly, Stuart Bailey, Will Holder, Xavier LeRoy, Edwin van der Heide, Isaac Julien, Antoni Muntadas, Peter Zinovieff, Bernard Stiegler, Griselda Pollock, Martha Rosler, Laura Mulvey, Silvia Federici, Oyeronke Oyewumi, Irit Rogoff, Yvonne Rainer, La Ribot, Isaac Julien, Lizzie Borden, Luke Fowler, Charles Bernstein, Kenneth Goldsmith, James Pritchett, Anri Sala, Eyal Weizman, Terike Haapoja, Martha Rosler, Natascha Sadr Haghighian, Élisabeth Lebovici, Vicki Bennett, Griselda Pollock, Cornelia Sollfrank, Chandra Wickramasinghe, John Oswald or Guy Schraenen among others.

RWM has also launched its own lines of research that flow from some of the ideas explored in the Museum, such as reflexions on radio as a medium in itself (an analysis of John Cage and the different ways he used radio, for example), the recovery of unpublished material by artists whose works are in the Museum's collection (such as Juan Muñoz's works for radio) and documentation of artistic movements with some link to music, such as RWM has also developed its own parallel lines of programming that investigate fields such as generative music, sound collecting, sound art and sound appropriationism.

== History ==
RWM began in 2006 as a tool through which to publicise the Museum's activities, but over the years it has grown into independent project, with over 800 podcasts under its belt. It produces its own content, building bridges between radiophonic production and other lines of work that are developed within the Museum. This includes everything from generating documentary material to programming activities and preparing monographic programmes on music scenes of all kinds, such as generative music, the history of sampling, the collapse of tonality, sound production in Eastern Europe and the sound avant-garde in Spain and Portugal, amongst many other.

In 2016, RWM set up a Working Group which works as an experimental laboratory, developing projects such as a collective sound library music, and setting up a varied range of inter-institutional collaborations.

== Projects ==
- Son[i]a: A line of programming based on short audio capsules that allow different cultural agents to speak in their own voice: directors, curators, artists, guest speakers and programmers.
- Quaderns d'Àudio (Audio Notebooks): Essays that broaden the areas of interest of Ràdio Web MACBA. QA is a collection of publications of texts related to RWM programming. Its aim is to complement the lines of work developed by the radio by making unpublished materials available, and also through the critical edition of hard-to-find texts that are important for understanding and exploring sound art. The texts are presented in downloadable, printable PDF format, and the layout allows different forms of assemblage: from basic stapling to Japanese binding, so that the end result can be similar to a conventional publication.
- Curatorial: A programming line that explores sound art through specifically commissioned works by artists such as Felix Kubin, Jon Leidecker (Wobbly), Marcus Schmickler, Chris Cutler, Florian Hecker, Barbara Held and Pilar Subirà.
- Specials: A series of programmes that focus on projects by artists and curators who have some kind of link to the Museum's Collection or the Museum programming.
- Research: Explores some of the key moments and figures in the contemporary sound world, through specific commissioned works by artists such as Roc Jiménez de Cisneros, Mark Fell and Joe Gilmore.
- Extra: A hybrid (audio + text) programming line that brings to light and documents research processes stemming from the other lines of programming. It includes deleted scenes, conversations with interviewees and transcripts.

== Awards and accolades ==
The RWM project has become an international benchmark in its field. It has received numerous awards for innovation in the dissemination of artistic content, including the Museums and the Web Best of the Web 2009 Podcast Award for the best podcast in the sector. Also in 2009, RWM had 18,000 hits and around 36,000 page views, from 90 different countries, with a strong presence in the United States and in Spain. The project has also spread to the world of traditional radio, with a range of collaborations with radio stations around the world, from Mexico to New Zealand. The project has also been presented in international conferences such as MuseumNext 2012, FIEC II and 'V Encuentro sobre Redes en Museos y Centros de Arte 2015. An interview on the project has also been featured in the #OpenCurating project by Latitudes and RWM.
