= Claude Rutault =

French painter (1941–2022)

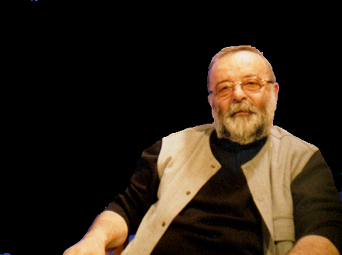
- Rutault in 2011
- Born: 25 October 1941
- Died: 27 May 2022 (aged 80)

Claude Rutault (25 October 1941 – 27 May 2022) was a French painter. He was born at Les Trois-Moutiers and died in Boulogne-Billancourt.

He was diagnosed with Alzheimer's disease in 2020, though no cause of death was given. He was known for not working on any of his paintings in any manner but rather having them created by a care-taker.

== Selected publications ==
- AMZ ou « le soleil brille pour tout le monde » dé-finition /méthode 169. 1985-87, published by the Centre des livres d'artistes, 2011, ISBN 978-2-917393-01-7
