= Wendy Brown =

American political theorist (born 1955)

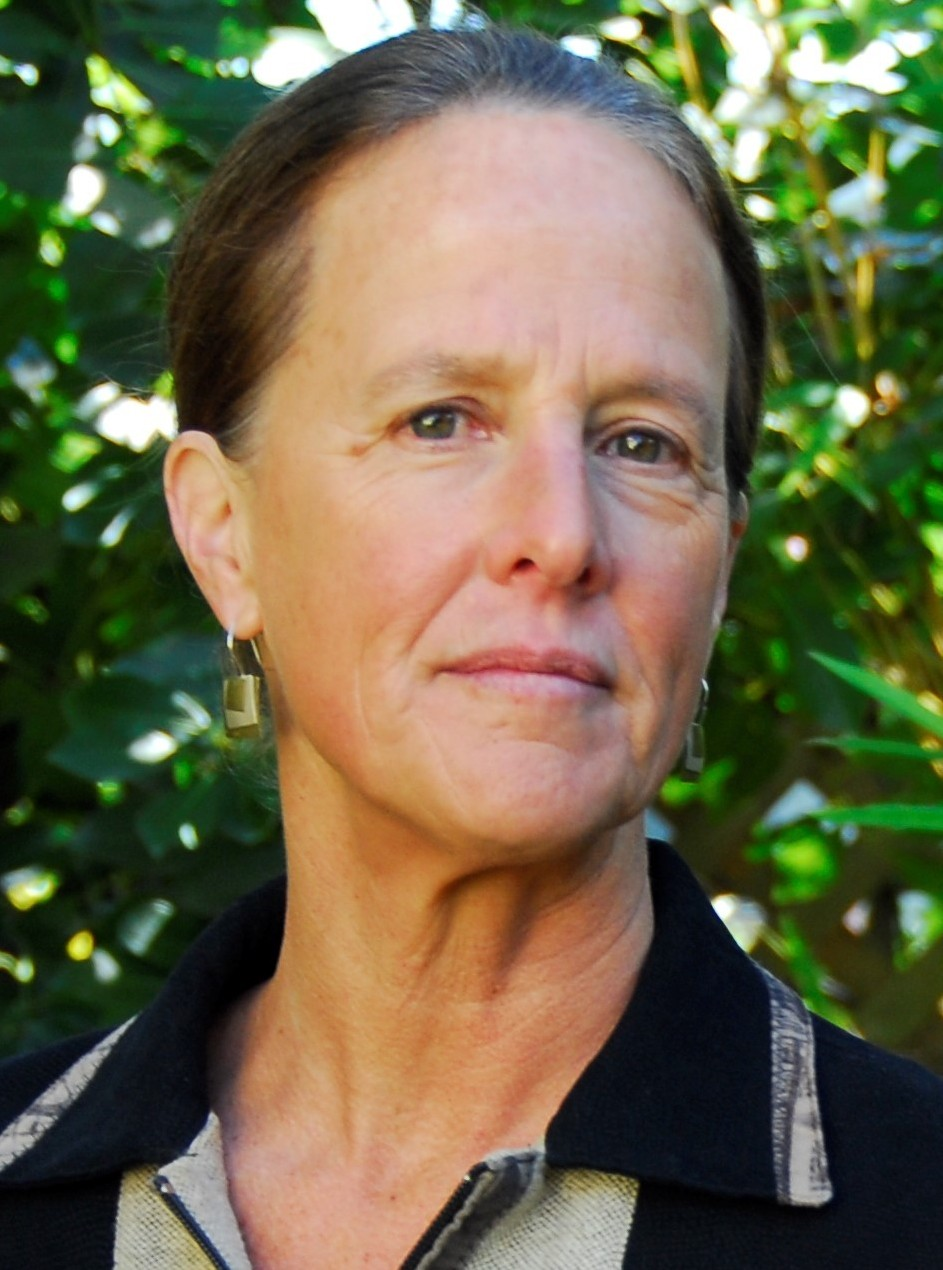
- Born: Wendy L. Brown; November 28, 1955 (age 70)
- Partner: Judith Butler
- Children: 1

Education
- Education: University of California, Santa Cruz (BA); Princeton University (MA, PhD)

Philosophical work
- Era: Contemporary philosophy
- Region: Western philosophy
- School: Continental philosophy; Critical theory; Third-wave feminism; Queer theory; Postmodernism; Post-structuralism; Critical legal studies
- Main interests: Democracy; Sovereignty; Citizenship; Rights; Gender; Identity; Power; Discourse; Liberalism; Neoliberalism; Tolerance; Psychoanalysis; State; Law; Secularism; Critique

Wendy L. Brown (born November 28, 1955) is an American political theorist. She is the UPS Foundation Professor in the School of Social Science at the Institute for Advanced Study in Princeton, New Jersey. Previously, she was Class of 1936 First Professor of Political Science and a core faculty member of critical theory at the University of California, Berkeley.

== Career ==
Brown received her BA in economics and politics from UC Santa Cruz, and her M.A and Ph.D. in political philosophy from Princeton University. She taught at Williams College and UC Santa Cruz before taking a position at UC Berkeley in 1999. Beyond her primary teaching roles in Political Theory and Critical Theory there, Brown was also an affiliated faculty member of the Department of Rhetoric, the Jurisprudence and Social Policy Program, the Designated Emphasis in Women, Gender and Sexuality, and the Designated Emphasis in early modern Studies.

In 2021, Brown was appointed to the faculty of the Institute for Advanced Study, where she holds the UPS Foundation chair. Brown lectures around the world and has held numerous visiting and honorary positions, including at the Institute for Human Sciences in Vienna, the Goethe University in Frankfurt, the UC Humanities Research Institute in Irvine, the Institute for the Humanities Critical Theory Summer School at Birkbeck, University of London (2012, 2015), a Senior Invited Fellow of the Center for Humanities at Cornell University (2013), a visiting professor at Columbia University (2014), a Phi Beta Kappa Visiting Lecturer (2014), a visiting professor of Law and Government at Cornell University (2015), the Shimizu Visiting professor of law at the London School of Economics (2015), and a visiting professor at the European Graduate School (2016).

Among the honorary lectures Brown has delivered are the Beaverbrook Annual Lecture at McGill University (2015); the Pembroke Center keynote at Brown University (2015); a keynote at the Zolberg Institute on Migration and Mobility (2016); the fourth "Democracy Lecture" – following Thomas Piketty, Naomi Klein, and Paul Mason – in the Haus der Kulturen der Welt in Berlin (2017); a plenary speech at the European Sociological Association conference in Athens (2017); the Gauss Lecture at Princeton University (2018); and the Wellek Lectures at UC Irvine (2018), which were published as In the Ruins of Neoliberalism: The Rise of Antidemocratic Politics in the West (2019). In 2019, Brown delivered The Tanner Lectures on Human Values at Yale University, titled "Politics and Knowledge in Nihilistic Times: Thinking with Max Weber."

Brown's work has been translated into more than twenty languages and has received many awards. Brown served as Council Member of the American Political Science Association (2007–09) and as Chair of the UC Humanities Research Institute Board of Governors (2009–11). In 2012, her book Walled States, Waning Sovereignty won the David Eastman Award. In 2017, her book Undoing the Demos won the Spitz Prize for the best book in liberal and/or democratic theory. Brown received the 2016 Distinguished Teaching Award, UC Berkeley's most prestigious honor for teaching. She received a UC Presidents Humanities Research Fellowship (2017–18) and was a Guggenheim Fellow (2017–18). In 2021 Brown received The Berkeley Citation, UC Berkeley's highest honor, for individuals who "go beyond the call of duty and whose achievements exceed the standards of excellence in their fields."

Brown's thinking on the decline of sovereignty and the hollowing out of democracy has found popular and journalistic audiences, with discussions of her work appearing in The New York Times, The Washington Post, and The Guardian. Brown has appeared in documentary films, including "The Value of the Humanities" (2014), Take Your Pills (2018), and "What is Democracy?" (directed by Astra Taylor, 2019).

Together with Michel Feher, Brown is co-editor of the Zone Books' series Near Futures and its digital supplement Near Futures Online.

== Overview of work ==
Brown has established new paradigms in critical legal studies and feminist theory. She has produced a body of work drawing from Karl Marx's critique of capitalism and its relation to religion and secularism, Friedrich Nietzsche's usefulness for thinking about power and the ruses of morality, Max Weber on the modern organization of power, psychoanalysis and its implications for political identification, Michel Foucault's work on governmentality and neoliberalism, as well as other contemporary continental philosophers. Bringing these resources together with her own thinking on a range of topics, Brown's work aims to diagnose modern and contemporary formations of political power, and to discern the threats to democracy entailed by such formations.

=== States of Injury: Power and Freedom in Late Modernity (1995) ===
In this work Brown asks how a sense of woundedness can become the basis for individual and collective forms of identity. From outlawing hate speech to banning pornography, Brown argues, well-intentioned attempts at protection can legitimize the state while harming subjects by codifying their identities as helpless or in need of continuous governmental regulation. While breaking ground in political theory, this work also represents one of Brown's key interventions in feminist and queer theory. The book offers a novel account of legal and political power as constitutive of norms of sexuality and gender. Through the concept of "wounded attachments", Brown contends that psychic injury may accompany and sustain racial, ethnic, and gender categories, particularly in relation to state law and discursive formations. In this and other works Brown has criticized representatives of second wave feminism, such as Catharine MacKinnon, for re-inscribing the category of "woman" as an essentialized identity premised on injury.

=== Politics Out of History (2001) ===
This book comprises a series of essays on contemporary political issues from the problem of moralism in politics to the legacies of past injustices in the present. Throughout her thematically overlapping chapters, Brown asks: "What happens to left and liberal political orientations when faith in progress is broken, when both the sovereign individual and sovereign states seem tenuous, when desire seems as likely to seek punishment as freedom, when all political conviction is revealed as contingent and subjective?" Much of this book takes history and liberalism themselves as objects of theoretical reflection and sites of contestation. Drawing on a range of thinkers, such as Freud, Marx, Nietzsche, Spinoza, Benjamin and Derrida, Brown rethinks the disorientation and possibility inherent to contemporary democracy.

=== Edgework: Critical Essays on Knowledge and Politics (2005) ===
This work consists of seven articles responding to particular occasions, each of which "mimic, in certain ways, the experience of the political realm: one is challenged to think here, now, about a problem that is set and framed by someone else, and to do so before a particular audience or in dialogue with others not of one's own choosing." Each individual essay begins with a specific problem: what is the relationship between love, loyalty, and dissent in contemporary American political life?; how did neoliberal rationality become a form of governmentality?; what are the main problems of women's studies programs?; and so on. According to Brown, the essays do not aim to definitively answer the given questions but "to critically interrogate the framing and naming practices, challenge the dogmas (including those of the Left and of feminism), and discern the constitutive powers shaping the problem at hand."

=== Regulating Aversion: Tolerance in the Age of Identity and Empire (2006) ===
In this book, Brown subverts the usual and widely accepted notion that tolerance is one of the most remarkable achievements of Western modernity. She suggests that tolerance (or toleration) cannot be perceived as the complete opposite to violence. At times, it can also be used to justify violence. Brown argues that tolerance primarily operates as a discourse of subject construction and a mode of governmentality that addresses or confirms asymmetric relations between different groups, each of which must then "tolerate" other groups and categories or "be tolerated" by the dominant groups and categories.

To substantiate her thesis, Brown examines the tolerance discourse of figures like George W. Bush, Jimmy Carter, Samuel Huntington, Susan Okin, Michael Ignatieff, Bernard Lewis, and Seyla Benhabib and argues that "tolerance as a political practice is always conferred by the dominant, it is always a certain expression of domination even as it offers protection or incorporation to the less powerful." Among those influenced by Brown's thinking on this subject are Joan Wallach Scott and Slavoj Žižek, whose respective works The Politics of the Veil (2007) and Violence: Six Sideways Reflections (2007) draw heavily on Brown's account of tolerance discourse.

In a debate with Rainer Forst at the ICI in Berlin Brown addressed this problematic again, later published as a co-authored book, The Power of Tolerance (2014). Here Brown argues against primarily moral or normative approaches to power and discourse, and warns against the dangers of uncritically celebrating the liberal ideal of tolerance, as frequently happens in Western notions of historical, civilizational or moral progress.

=== Les Habits neufs de la politique mondiale (2007) ===
Published exclusively in French, Les habits neufs de la politique mondiale (The New Clothes of World Politics) argues that the following political fact is irreversible: liberal democracy, as a global social and historical modality of statecraft, is dying. The two movements delivering such blows, neoliberalism and neoconservatism, feature both resonances and dissonances. Brown argues that whilst the former acts as a political rationality, a mode of general regulation of behavior, the latter is both necessary to its survival, and parasitic of its survival. As a form of governmentality that redefines freedom, neoliberalism will moralize politics, limiting its scope; this is the function of neo-conservatism.

=== Walled States, Waning Sovereignty (2010) ===
This book examines the revival of wall-building under shifting conditions of global capitalism. Brown not only problematizes the assumed functions of walls, such as the prevention of crime, migration, smuggling, and so on. She also argues that walling has taken on new a significance due to its symbolic function in an increasingly globalized and precarious world of financial capital. As individual identity as well as nation-state sovereignty are threatened, walls become objects invested with individual and collective desire. Anxious efforts to shore up national identity are thus projected onto borders as well as new material structures that would appear to secure them. The book was reprinted with a new preface by the author following the 2016 election of Donald Trump.

=== Undoing the Demos: Neoliberalism's Stealth Revolution (2015) ===
Brown's study begins by engaging and revising key arguments in Foucault's The Birth of Biopolitics with the aim of analyzing different ways that democracy is being hollowed out by neoliberal rationality. She describes neoliberalism as a thoroughgoing attack on the most foundational ideas and practices of democracy. The individual chapters of the book examine the effects of neoliberalization on higher education, law, governance, the basic principles of liberal democratic institutions, as well as radical democratic imaginaries.

Brown treats "neoliberalism as a governing rationality through which everything is 'economized' and in a very specific way: human beings become market actors and nothing but, every field of activity is seen as a market, and every entity (whether public or private, whether person, business, or state) is governed as a firm." To address such threats, Brown argues, democracy must be reinvigorated not only as an object of theoretical inquiry but also as a site of political struggle.

=== In the Ruins of Neoliberalism: The Rise of Anti-Democratic Politics in the West (2019) ===
In this book, Brown analyses the hard-right turn in Western politics. While this turn is animated by socioeconomically aggrieved white working- and middle-class populations, Brown argues that it is also contoured by the multipronged assault on democratic values taking place under neoliberalism. In the Ruins of Neoliberalism traces the ambition to replace democratic orders with ones disciplined by markets and traditional morality, and democratic states with technocratic ones. Brown also explores the unintentional outcomes of neoliberal reason, from its attack on the value of society and its fetish of individual freedom to its legitimation of inequality, to understand how it generates an apocalyptic populism willing to destroy the world rather than endure a future in which white male supremacy disappears.

=== Nihilistic Times: Thinking with Max Weber (2023) ===
Brown's latest book, published in 2023 by Harvard University Press, addresses the pervasive nihilism corroding contemporary political and academic spheres. Drawing from Max Weber's Vocation Lectures, Brown scrutinizes the devaluation of knowledge and political responsibility caused by nihilism. She highlights nihilism's impact on politics, transforming it into a playground for demagogues, and academia, turning it into an ideological battleground. Brown explores Weber's insights on countering nihilism, advocating for a reexamination of truth and a reinvigoration of integrity in both scholarly and political realms. While acknowledging Weber's distinctions between academia and politics, Brown proposes reparative strategies for our times, urging the left to uphold critical thinking and embrace radical democratic ideals while navigating the challenges posed by nihilism.

== Public life ==
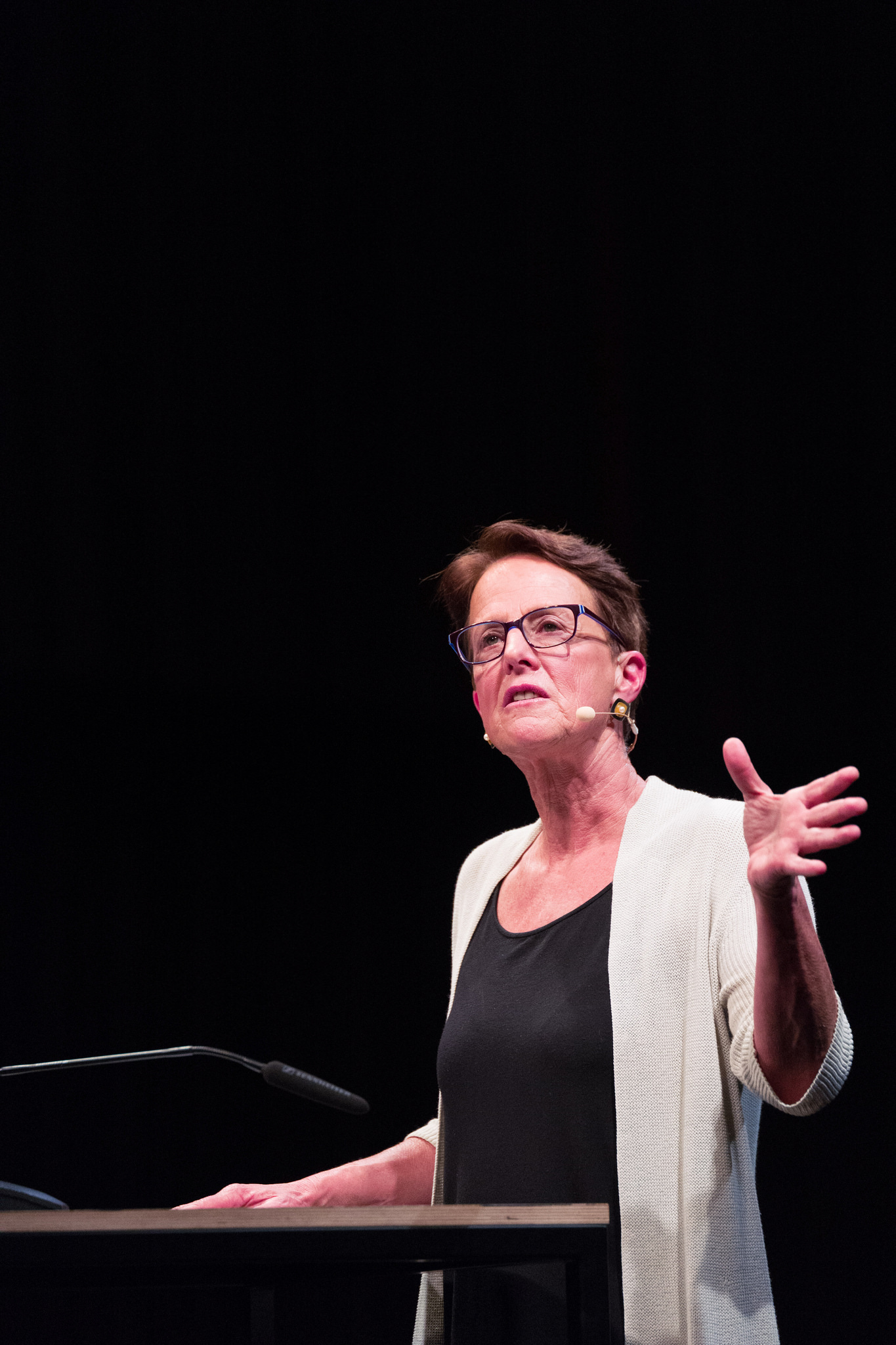
Brown giving the Democracy Lecture at the HKW Berlin in 2017

A public intellectual in the United States, Brown has written and spoken about issues of free speech, public education, political protest, LGBTQ+ rights, sexual assault, Donald Trump, conservatism, neoliberalism, Israel and Palestine, and other matters of national and international concern.

For decades, Brown has been active in efforts to resist measures toward the privatization of the University of California system. In her capacity as co-chair of the Berkeley Faculty Association, she raised awareness, organized marches, and spoke publicly about the privatization of public education. She has been critical of the university's decision to cut costs by using lecturers rather than hiring tenure and tenure track professors. Relatedly, she has voiced concern over the perils of the UC's proposed online education programs.

Brown has criticized university administration for their response to sexual assault. "I think many faculty feel there are repeat harassers on our faculty who are never charged ... Graduate students gave up on careers, and these perpetrators were allowed to continue, and that was wrong—never should have happened," she said.

At the "99 Mile March" to Sacramento, she addressed her criticism to more general trends: "We are marching to draw attention to the plight of public education in California and to implore Californians to re-invest in it. For all its resources, innovation and wealth, California has sunk to nearly the bottom of the nation in per student spending, and our public higher education system, once the envy of the world, is in real peril." Brown supported Occupy Wall Street as part of the UC faculty council, claiming that "We understand this to be part of what (the movement) stands for. We are delighted by the protests and consider our campaign to be at one with it."

== Personal life ==
Brown is a native of California and lives in Berkeley with her partner Judith Butler and son.

== Bibliography ==
=== Books in English ===
- Nihilistic Times: Thinking with Max Weber (Harvard University Press, 2023)
- In the Ruins of Neoliberalism: The Rise of Antidemocratic Politics in the West (Columbia University Press, 2019).
- Undoing the Demos: Neoliberalism's Stealth Revolution (Zone Books, 2015; 4th printing, 2017).
- Walled States, Waning Sovereignty (Zone Books, 2010, 2nd printing with a new Preface, 2017).
- Regulating Aversion: Tolerance in the Age of Identity and Empire (Princeton University Press, 2006).
- Edgework: Critical Essays in Knowledge and Politics (Princeton University Press, 2005).
- Politics Out of History (Princeton University Press, 2001).
- States of Injury: Power and Freedom in Late Modernity (Princeton University Press, 1995).
- Manhood and Politics: A Feminist Reading in Political Thought (Rowman and Littlefield, 1988).

=== Edited and co-authored books ===
- Authoritarianism, co-authored with Peter E. Gordon and Max Pensky (University of Chicago Press, 2018).
- Near Futures Online, "Europe at a Crossroads," co-edited with Michel Feher, William Callison, Milad Odabaei and Aurélie Windels, Issue No. 1 (March 2016).
- The Power of Tolerance, co-authored with Rainer Forst (New York: Columbia University Press, 2014; Berlin: Turia & Kant, 2014).
- Is Critique Secular? Injury, Blasphemy and Free Speech, co-authored with Judith Butler, Saba Mahmood and Talal Asad (University of California Press, 2009); re-issued, with a new co-authored introduction (Fordham University Press, 2015).
- Democracy in What State?, edited by Giorgio Agamben, Alain Badiou, Daniel Bensaid, Wendy Brown, Jean-Luc Nancy, Jacques Ranciere, Kristin Ross, and Slavoj Žižek. Translated by William McCuaig (Columbia University Press, 2011).
- Left Legalism/Left Critique, co-edited with Janet Halley (Duke University Press, 2002).
