= Edition (printmaking) =

Prints struck from one plate

In printmaking, an edition is a number of prints struck from one plate, usually at the same time. This may be a limited edition, with a fixed number of impressions produced on the understanding that no further impressions (copies) will be produced later, or an open edition limited only by the number that can be sold or produced before the plate wears. Most modern artists produce only limited editions, normally signed by the artist in pencil, and numbered as say 67/100 to show the unique number of that impression and the total edition size.

== Original or reproduction? ==
An important and often confused distinction is that between editions of original prints, produced in the same medium as the artist worked (e.g., etching, or lithography), and reproduction prints (or paintings), which are photographic reproductions of the original work, essentially in the same category as a picture in a book or magazine, though better printed and on better paper. These may be marketed as "limited editions" with investment potential (which is rarely realized), and even signed and numbered by the artist. Some knowledge is often required to tell the difference.

== Development of the concept ==
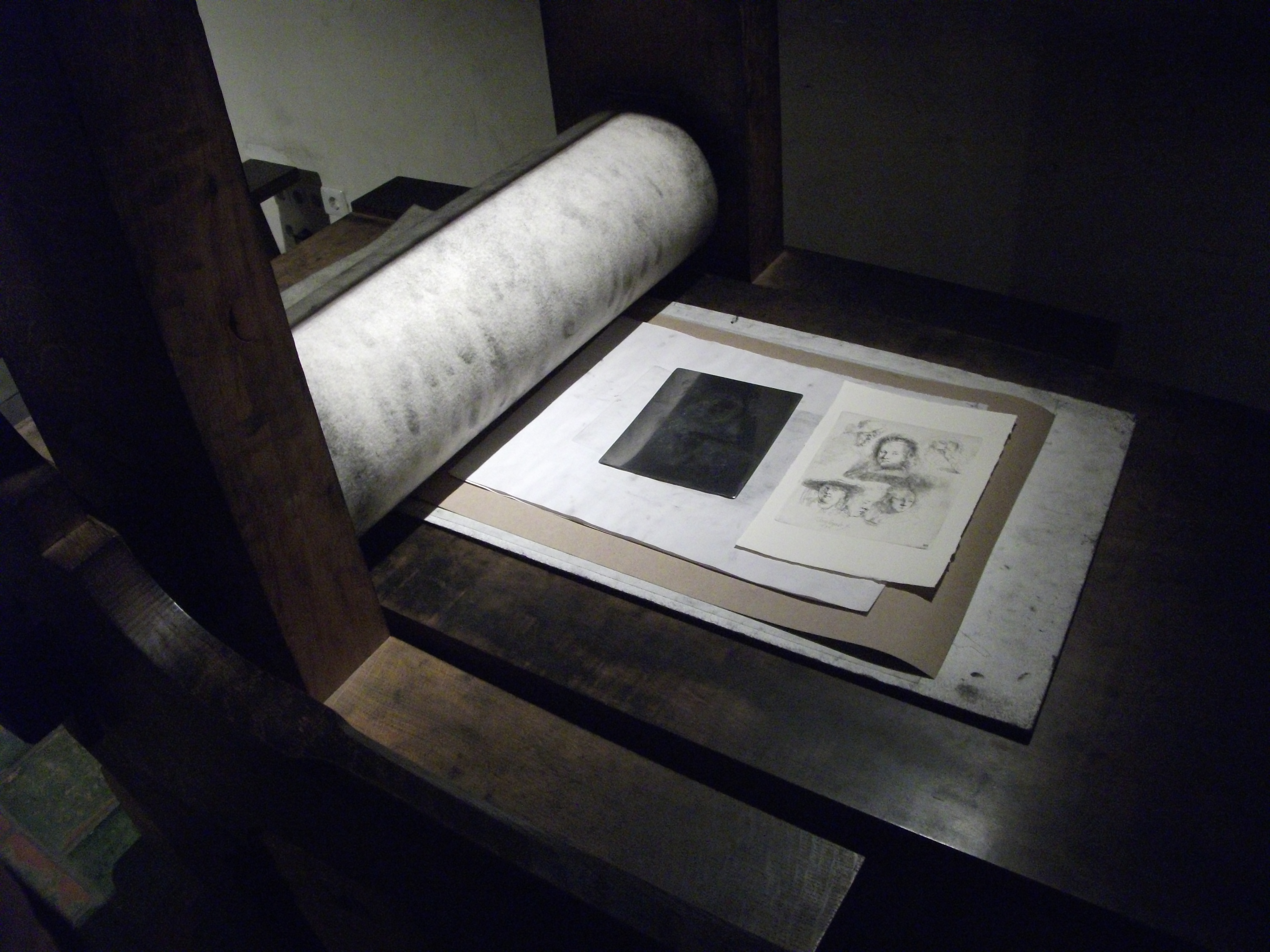
Rembrandt House Museum, printing studio

One of the main reasons for the development of printmaking was the desire of artists to make more money from their work by selling multiple copies; printmaking satisfies this motive. The production of multiple copies also tends to reduce production costs and market price when compared to a single or unique image. Until the 19th century, in the period of the Old master print the concept of an edition did not really apply to prints, unlike books. Prints were often run off as demand allowed, and often worn-out plates were reworked by the original artist or another, to produce a new state. The art market attempts to distinguish between "lifetime impressions" and "late impressions", which were produced after the death of the artist. This can be done to some extent by the study of the paper involved, and its watermark, and the condition of the plate as revealed by the printed image. But it remains a difficult area.

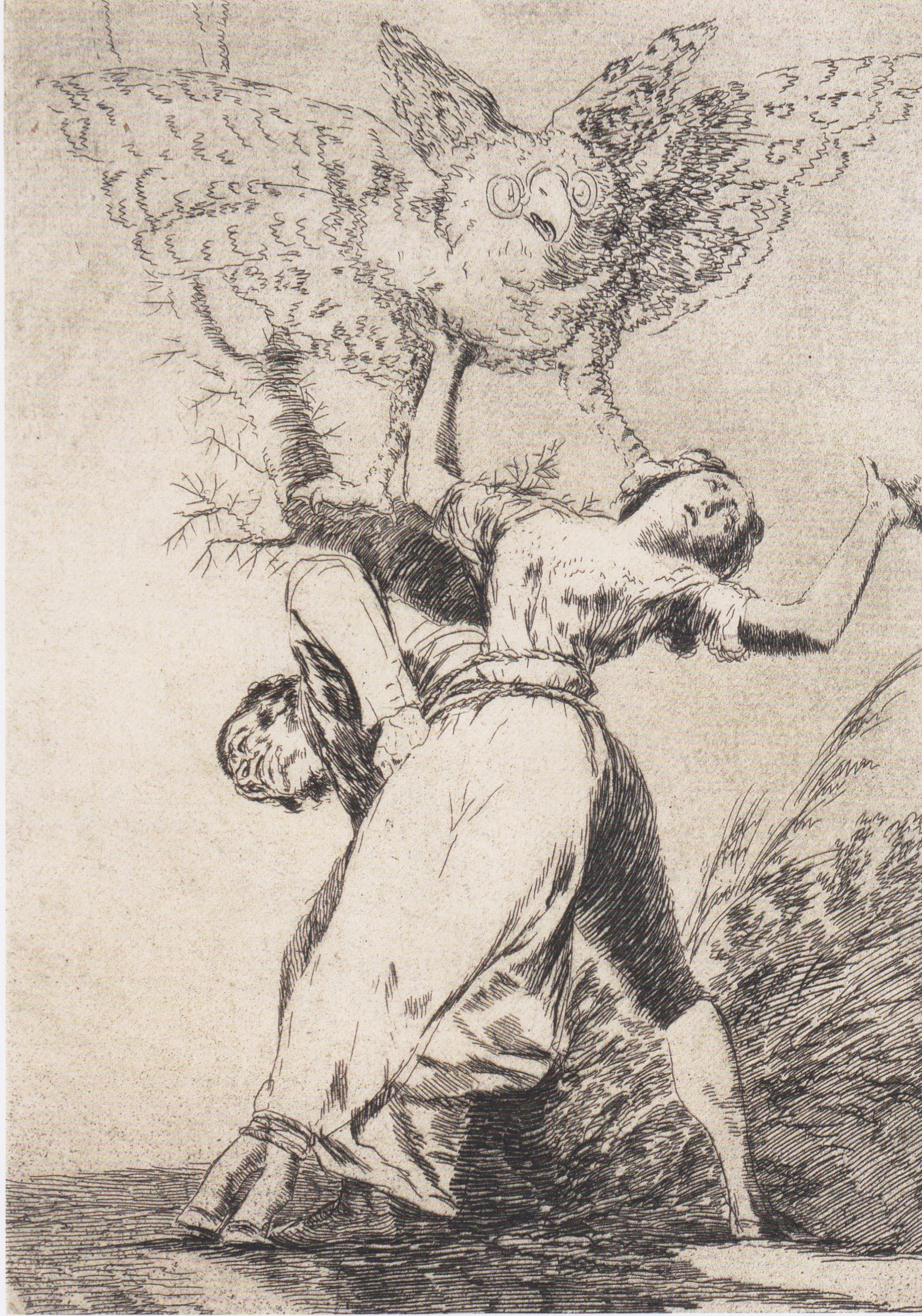
Aquatint by Goya, from the Cycle "Los Caprichos": Can't Anyone Untie Us?

The aquatints of Goya, which are done in a technique that wears out quickly on the plate, were the first important prints to be published initially in limited editions, which however were not signed or numbered. In fact the plates survived, and since Goya's death several further editions have been published, showing a progressive and drastic decline in quality of the image, despite some rework. Because of this and other cases, "posthumous editions" produced after the death of an artist, and obviously not signed by him, are usually far less sought after. The plates of later prints are often "cancelled" by defacing the image, with a couple of impressions of the cancelled plate taken to document it. This is now expected by collectors and investors, who want the prints they buy to retain their value.

== Modern practice ==
Prints by artists today may potentially retain their financial value as art (i.e., as an appreciating investment) because they are created by an artistic process rather than by a strictly mechanical one, and may become scarce because the number of multiples is limited. In Rembrandt's time, the limit on the size of an edition was practical: a plate degrades through use, putting an upper limit on the number of images to be struck. Plates can be reworked and restored to some degree, but it is generally not possible to create more than a thousand prints from any process except lithography or woodcut. A few hundred is a more practical upper limit, and even that allows for significant variation in the quality of the image. In drypoint, 10 or 20 may be the maximum number of top-quality impressions possible.

Today, artists will sometimes refer to a print as a "one-off," meaning that the artist has made a unique print and no reproductions of it from the original matrix, often not even a proof. In this category one sometimes finds monotypes, monoprints, collagraphs, altered prints with collage or chine colle additions, or even hand-colored prints. There remain artists who are strong advocates of "artist's prints" which are conceived, printed, signed, and given the edition number 1/1 by the artist.

== Numbering ==
Because of the variation in quality, lower-numbered prints in an edition are sometimes favored as superior, especially with older works where the image was struck until the plate wore out. However the numbering of impressions in fact may well not equate at all to the sequence in which they were printed, and may often be the reverse of it.

In later times, printmakers recognized the value of limiting the size of an edition and including the volume of the edition in the print number (e.g., "15/30" for the 15th print in an edition of 30). Tight controls on the process to limit or eliminate variation in quality have become the norm. In monotyping, a technique where only two impressions at most can be taken, prints may be numbered 1/1, or marked "unique". Artists usually print an edition much smaller than the plate allows, both for marketing reasons and to keep the edition comfortably within the lifespan of the plate. Specific steps may also be taken to strengthen the plate, such as electroplating intaglio images, which uses an electric process to put a very thin coat of a stronger metal onto a plate of a weaker metal.

The conventions for numbering prints are well-established, a limited edition is normally hand signed and numbered by the artist, typically in pencil, in the form (e.g.): 14/100. The first number is the number of the print itself. The second number is the number of overall prints the artist will print of that image. The lower the second number is, the more valuable and collectible the limited editions are likely to be, within whatever their price range is. Other marks may indicate that a print has been made in addition to the numbered prints of an edition. Artist's proofs are marked "A. P." or "P/A", sometimes E. A. or E. d'A. (épreuve d'artiste); monoprints and uniquely hand-altered prints are marked "unique"; prints that are given to someone or are for some reason unsuitable for sale are marked "H. C." or "H/C", meaning "hors de commerce", not for sale. These are usually prints reserved for the publisher, like Artist's Proofs. The printer is also often allowed to retain some proof impressions; these are marked "P. P." Finally, a master image may be printed against which the members of the edition are compared for quality: these are marked as "bon à tirer" or "BAT" ("good to print" in French). In all, the number of the main edition can represent 50% or less of the total number of good impressions taken.

Professional artist printmakers will sometimes limit an edition to several artist's proof copies, including a "bon a tirer" print and then one unique copy designated as a "one-off" or "1/1" or "one/off".

== Consumer protection laws ==
In the United States limited editions are regulated under state consumer protections laws. California became the first state to regulate the sale of limited edition art prints with the "California Print Law" of 1971. The state of Illinois later expanded on the California statute. However, it was not until 1986 that more comprehensive provisions, still in place today, were enacted with the passage of the "Georgia Print Law". That law became the template for statutes subsequently enacted by other states. The Georgia Print Law written by (former) State Representative Chesley V. Morton, became effective July 1, 1986. The law requires art dealers, artists, or auctioneers to supply information to prospective purchasers about the nature of the print, the number of prints and editions (including HC editions) produced, and the involvement (if any) of the artist in the creation of the print. The penalty for violation of the law ranges from simple reimbursement to treble damages, in the case of a willful violation. Those found to be in violation of the law are also liable for court costs, expenses, and attorney fees. The law applies to works of art valued at more than $100.00 (not including frame). Charitable organizations are specifically exempt from the provision of the law. The statute of limitations is one year after discovery, and, if discovery of the violation is not made within three years of the sale, then the purchaser’s remedies are extinguished.

== See also ==
- Historical editions (music)
- Special edition
- Artist's multiple
- Textual scholarship
