= Michal Martychowiec =

Polish-German contemporary artist

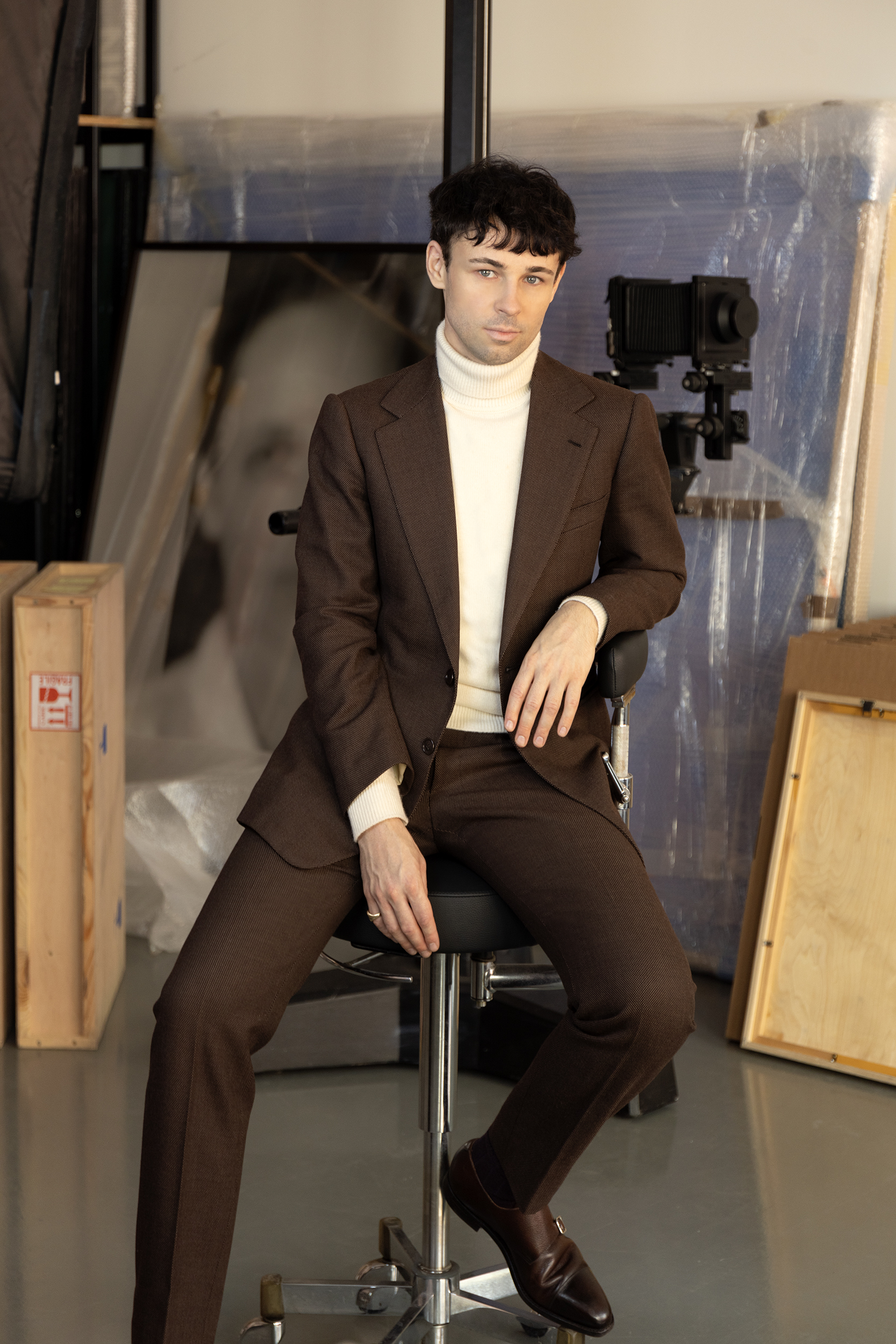
- Born: 1987 (age 38–39); Lublin, Poland
- Education: Central Saint Martins College of Art and Design
- Known for: Photography, Film, Installation, Drawing, Neon, Sculpture
- Website: https://michalmartychowiec.com/

Michal Martychowiec (born 1987) is a contemporary conceptual artist living between Berlin and London.

== Career ==
Michal Martychowiec was born in Lublin, Poland in 1987. Martychowiec received a master's degree with distinction in 2011 from Central Saint Martins College of Art and Design in London.

In February 2016 Martychowiec gave a lecture at the Russian Institute of Art History in St. Petersburg. He is a visiting lecturer at China Academy of Art in Hangzhou. His art is in both public and private collections, including institutions such as OCAT in Nanjing, the British Artists' Film & Video Study Collection in London, the Centre of Contemporary Art Ujazdowski Castle, C/O in Milan, and the Signum Foundation in Venice.

Martychowiec has exhibited widely in Europe and Asia, with solo shows at institutions such as Centro Párraga (Murcia), Weserburg Museum of Modern Art (Bremen), and Staatliche Kunsthalle Baden-Baden. His work has also been featured in the Beijing Biennial, Trio Biennial (Rio de Janeiro), Lianzhou Foto Festival, and numerous group exhibitions. He was a finalist of the 2021 Berlin Masters Award and a recipient of the 2022 Blue Project Foundation Prize.

Martychowiec works across various media, including photography, film, drawing, neon, painting, sculpture, and installation. His work often incorporates socio-political commentary. Martychowiec work often explores the contemporary human condition through the lens of history, often making symbolic references to locations, events, figures, and artworks. Themes of freedom, power structures, and the human condition are often prevalent in his work
