= Juergen Staack =

German artist

- Born: 1978 (age 47–48); Doberlug-Kirchhain
- Education: Kunstakademie Duesseldorf, Düsseldorf, Germany
- Known for: minimal art, conceptual art, photography
- Notable work: light sketch; Tableaux; SHADOWS; Eisflüstern; WEI; Silent Talk; FUGE; Transcription-Image
- Website: juergenstaack.com

Juergen Staack (born in Doberlug-Kirchhain in 1978) is a German minimalist and conceptual artist based in Düsseldorf.

== Training and background ==
After completing high school, Juergen Staack trained as a photographer. He subsequently attended Kunstakademie Düsseldorf from 2002 to 2008 where he studied with Thomas Ruff and Christopher Williams. In 2003, while still a student, he founded the artist group FEHLSTELLE along with other students.

== Work ==
Staack developed his own forms of expression in conceptual photography very early in his career, both questioning the translatability of photography to language as well as the “material fragility of the analog photograph and, in its fleeting quality, the digital photograph as well.” Towards this end, he uses various media such as performance, sound, video, sculpture, and photography and frequently makes the beholder a constitutive component of the artwork itself. Recurring themes in Staack’s work include the relationship between the image and its reproduction as well as its authenticity and origin, which he repeatedly questions. “His drawings, sound installations, speaking images, and poetic performances,” as the journalist Helga Meister laconically comments, “demonstrate the limits of visual representation.” Meanwhile, Peter Friese, former director of Bremen’s Museum Weserburg, concludes:

In his artistic work, Staack is not only interested in the questions of What an image is? What constitutes an image? How, when, and where does it emerge? But also: what is the importance of an image in a world shaped by visual stimuli? He finds his terrain as a conceptual artist precisely in the image’s controversial claim to truth and the mass saturation of our world with ever more advanced media of communication. Results of this research are in part surprising investigations that are critical of the image and the media. Staack here moves in the liminal areas of photography and, with a critical gaze that questions contexts, examines the social-anchored use of images with information that crosses various media, with language and text.

For Staack, unexpected processes of transformation and translation play a special role in a literal and metaphorical sense. Using illegible codes or news items that dissolve, his works unsettle classical structures of communication, sometimes taking them to absurd lengths. In so doing, they demonstrate “not only gaps between perception and communication, but also the limits of visual representation. In the age of an all dominating global visual culture,” according to art historian Sabine Maria Schmidt, "Juergen Staack poses the question of the foundations and elements that generate images in an entirely new way.”

== Exhibitions ==
=== Solo exhibitions (selection) ===
- 2006: Left Behind, … Missing Pictures, Gallery Space Other, Boston, USA
- 2010: Transformation, Galerie Konrad Fischer, Düsseldorf, Germany
- 2013: SAKHA, Galerie Konrad Fischer, Berlin, Germany
- 2013: Script, artothek – Raum für Junge Kunst, Cologne, Germany
- 2014: Zwei, Galerie Konrad Fischer, Düsseldorf, Germany
- 2016: Reduktion der Wirklichkeit, Kunstverein Oldenburg, Oldenburg, Germany
- 2016: DISPUT, Kunstverein Ruhr, Essen, Germany
- 2020: Hans-Peter Feldmann, Thomas Ruff, Juergen Staack, Galerie Konrad Fischer, Düsseldorf, Germany
- 2023: Eilike Schlenkhoff, Juergen Staack, Marburger Kunstverein, Marburg, Germany
- 2023: Time, Da in die Front, Düsseldorf, Germany
- 2023: ABERRATION - EROSION - V1S10N, Gallery LOHAUS SOMINSKY, Munich, Germany
- 2024: UNSERDEUTSCH, Galerie Konrad Fischer, Berlin, Germany
- 2024: The Order of Time, Hong Soun & Juergen Staack, SEOJUNG ART Gallery, Seoul, Republic of Korea

=== Group exhibitions (selection) ===
- 2004: realismus update, Jacobi Haus Künstlerverein Malkasten, Düsseldorf, Germany
- 2005: Rencontre des Arles, Arles, France
- 2009: FEHLSTELLE – LA ZONA, Public Space, Milan, Italy
- 2010: Aber Schwarz ist keine Farbe, Galerie Konrad Fischer, Düsseldorf, Germany
- 2011: ars viva – 2011/12, Museum Folkwang, Essen; Riga Art Space, Riga; Museum Weserburg, Bremen, Germany
- 2011: Hantmann Staack, Kunstraum, Düsseldorf, Germany
- 2012: Renania Libre, Galería Helga de Alvear, Madrid, Spain
- 2013: Transfer, MMCA, National Museum for Contemporary Art, Seoul; Museum Osthaus, Hagen, Germany
- 2015: AAA – Art and the City, Zurich, Switzerland
- 2015: More Konzeption – Conception now, Museum Morsbroich, Leverkusen, Germany
- 2015: daily sounds around, Weltkunstzimmer, Düsseldorf, Germany
- 2016: Offenes Depot, Kunsthaus NRW Kornelimünster, Aachen, Germany
- 2017: Duett mit KünstlerIn, Museum Morsbroich, Leverkusen, Germany
- 2017: Luther und die Avantgarde, Altes Gefängnis, Wittenberg, Germany
- 2017: asphalt – Kunststörer, Alte Kämmerei, Düsseldorf, Germany
- 2017: Mit den Händen zu greifen und doch nicht zu fassen, Kunsthalle Mainz, Mainz, Germany
- 2017: Stress Field, Fine Arts Literature Art Center, Wuhan, China
- 2017: Duett mit KünstlerIn, Belvedere 21, Vienna, Austria
- 2018: Deutschland ist keine Insel, Bundeskunsthalle, Bonn, Germany
- 2018: büro komplex, Kunsthaus NRW, Aachen, Germany
- 2019: Listen to the image, look at the sound, Kai10 – Arthena Foundation, Düsseldorf, Germany
- 2021: Sound and Silence, Kunstmuseum Bonn, Bonn, Germany
- 2022: Channel: Wave-Particle-Duality, Changwon Sculpture Biennale, Changwon, Republic of Korea
- 2022: The reality is there anyway, Weltkunstzimmer, Düsseldorf, Germany
- 2023: A Celebration – the 30th anniversary of the Friends of the Museum für Neue Kunst, Museum for New Art, Freiburg, Germany
- 2024: Liminal Stages: Explorations on Perception, Existence and Techno-consciousness, Wind H Art Center, Beijing, China
- 2024: Viewing the World - Positions of current post-photography and digital image culture, Kunstsammlungen Chemnitz, Chemnitz, Germany
- 2024: Untimely Resonance - Betwixt & Between Waves, Alternativ Space LOOP, Seoul, Republic of Korea
- 2025: VERBAL NON VERBAL, LOHAUS SOMINSKY Gallery, Munich, Germany

== Works in collections ==
- Bundeskunstsammlung (Sammlung zeitgenössischer Kunst der Bundesrepublik Deutschland)
- Sammlung Museum Folkwang
- Fördersammlung NRW
- Sammlung des Kunstpalastes
- Sammlung Wemhöhner
- Sammlung Philara

== Prizes, residencies, fellowships ==
=== Prizes ===
- 2011: Förderpreis der Stadt Düsseldorf für Bildende Kunst
- 2011: ars viva-Preis für Bildende Kunst
- 2012: NEW POSITIONS (Art Cologne)

=== Fellowships ===
- 2009: Artist in residence, Tokyo Wonder Site
- 2009: Kunststiftung NRW, project funding, Transcription-Image (die Sprache der Ainu)
- 2012: Kunststiftung NRW, project funding, Eisflüstern
- 2012: Artist in residence, Changdong Seoul (TRANSFER NRW–Korea), South Korea
- 2013: Artist in residence, Art Space Estemp, Sao Paulo
- 2015: Stiftung Kunstfonds (fellowship)
- 2015: Artist in Residence, Hongcheon (Pink Factory), South Korea
- 2020: Stiftung Kunstfonds, project funding, 7 Rooms of Life
- 2020: Stiftung Kunstfonds, project funding, Unserdeutsch auf Papua Neu-Guinea

== Bibliography ==
- “Deutschland ist keine Insel” Sammlung zeitgenössischer Kunst der Bundesrepublik Deutschland. Ankäufe von 2012 bis 2016 (Cologne: Kunst- und Ausstellungshalle der Bundesrepublik Deutschland and Wienand Verlag, 2018).
- Reduktion der Wirklichkeit. Juergen Staack (Oldenburg: Oldenburger Kunstverein, 2017).
- 4th Documentary Exhibition of Fine Arts: Stress Field (Wuhan: Hubei Museum of Art & Fine Arts Literature Art Center, 2017).
- ars viva 2011/2012 – Sprache/Language: Erik Bünger, Philipp Goldbach, Juergen Staack, ed. Kulturkreis der deutschen Wirtschaft im BDI e. V. (Ostfildern: Hatje Cantz Verlag, 2012, ISBN 978-3-7757-3269-7.
- Estemp(orary). Fünf Ausstellungen im “Off-Raum” (Düsseldorf, 2010), ISBN 978-3-00-032381-2.
