= Michel Feher =

Belgian philosopher

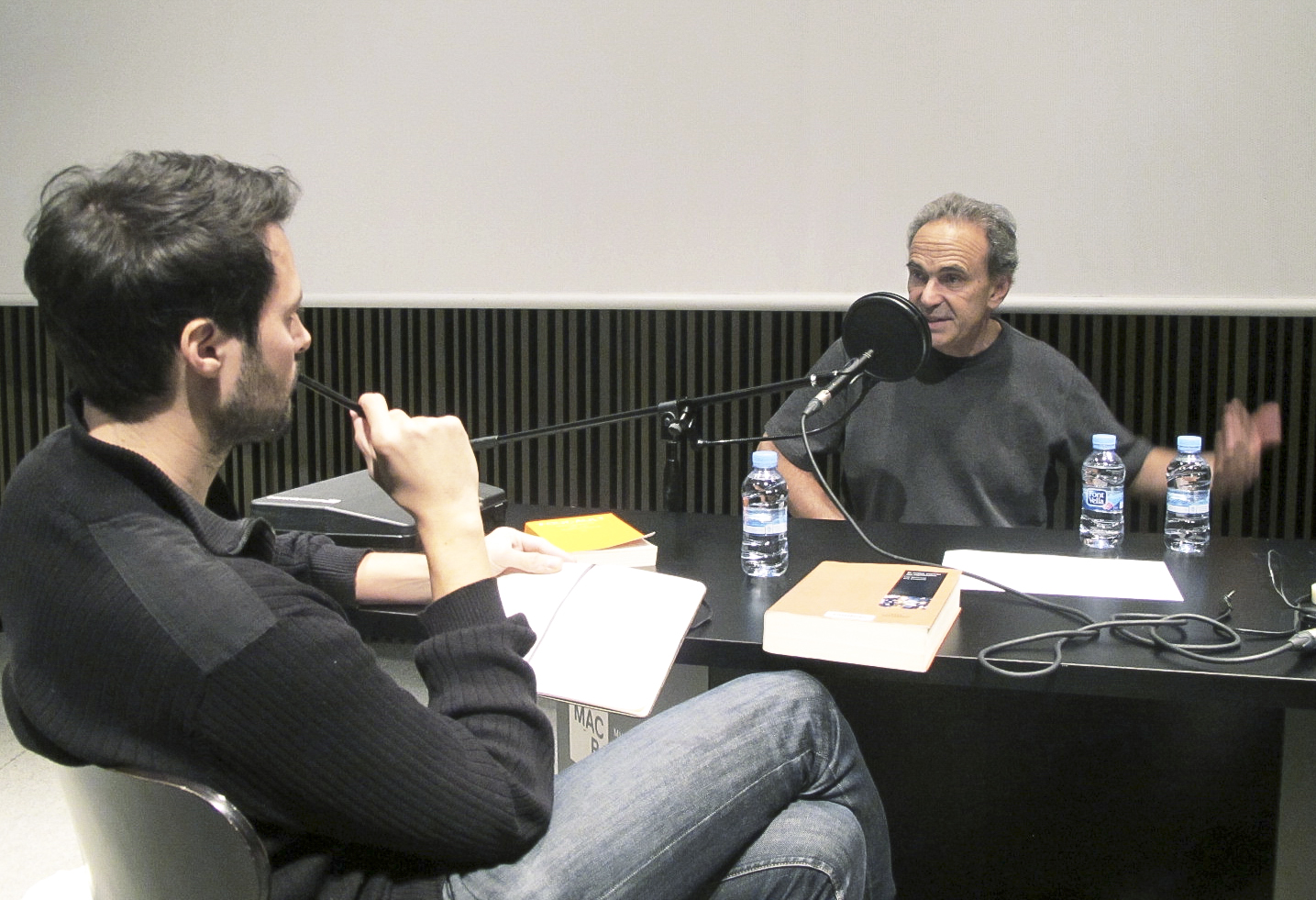
Michel Feher interviewed by Ràdio Web MACBA.

Michel Feher (born 1956) is a Belgian philosopher and cultural theorist who writes in English and French. He is the founding editor of Zone Books and the co-founder and president of Cette France-là, Paris, a monitoring group on French immigration policy. Feher writes for a number of outlets and has a semi-regular blog with the French journal Mediapart. He has held the positions of Professor and Visiting Lecturer at various universities, including École Normale Supérieure in Paris, the University of California, Berkeley, and most recently, Goldsmiths, University of London.

Feher has been called "one of the most insightful observers of financialized capitalism writing today."

Together with Wendy Brown, Michel Feher is co-editor of Zone Books' series Near Futures. In 2016, Feher co-edited "Europe at a Crossroads" with William Callison, Milad Odabaei and Aurélie Windels, the first issue of Near Futures Online, the digital companion to Zone's Near Futures series.

== Works ==
=== Books and edited volumes in English ===
- Rated Agency: Investee Politics in a Speculative Age (Zone Books, 2018).
- (ed. with William Callison, Milad Odabaei and Aurélie Windels) Europe at a Crossroads, Near Futures Online, Issue No. 1 (March 2016).
- (ed. with Gaëlle Krikorian and Yates McKee) Nongovernmental Politics, MIT Press, 2007.
- (ed. with Paul Rabinow) The Essential Works of Michel Foucault, 1954-1984. Vol 2. Aesthetics: Method and Epistemology, 2000.
- Powerless by Design: The Age of the International Community, 2000.
- (ed.) The Libertine Reader: Eroticism and Enlightenment in Eighteenth-Century France, 1997.
- (ed. with Ramona Naddaff and Nadia Tazi) Fragments for a History of the Human Body, 3 Volumes, 1989. (Spanish translation: Fragmentos para una historia del cuerpo humano, 1990.)
- (ed. with Jonathan Crary and Sanford Kwinter) Zone 1-2: The Contemporary Cities, 1986.

=== Articles in English ===
- "Disposing of the Discredited: A European Project" in Mutant Neoliberalism: Market Rule and Political Rupture, William Callison and Zachary Manfredi, eds. (Fordham University Press, 2020).
- "Movements of Counter-Speculation: A Conversation with Michel Feher," Interview by William Callison, Los Angeles Review of Books (July 12, 2019).
- "The Political Ascendency of Creditworthiness," Public Books, 1.9.2019.
- (with Eyal Weizman, Yve-Alain Bois, and Hal Foster), "On Forensic Architecture: A Conversation with Eyal Weizman," October, Volume | (Spring 2016) p. 116-140.
- "Belonging and Neoliberalism: Michel Feher, in conversation with James Graham" in After Belonging: The Objects, Spaces, and Territories of the Ways We Stay in Transit (Zürich: Lars Müller, 2016), 313-320.
- The Critical State of the Union, in 'Europe at a Crossroads', Near Futures Online, Issue No. 1 (March 2016).
- "Europe and the spectre of democracy: Michel Feher interviews Yanis Varoufakis," Open Democracy (13 May 2016).
- Brave New World Redux, Max de Estaban (2015).
- Self-Appreciation; or, The Aspirations of Human Capital, Public Culture, Vol. 21, No. 1 (2009).
- The Saudi Mirror, Public Culture, Vol. 18, No. 2 (2006).
- Constancy in Context, Wisconsin International Law Journal, Volume 24, Issue 3 (2006).
- Empowerment Hazards: Affirmative Action, Recovery Psychology, and Identity Politics, Representations, Vol. 55 Summer (1996).

=== Books and edited volumes in French ===
- Le temps des investis: essai sur la nouvelle question sociale, Paris, La Découverte, 2017.
- Éric Alliez, Michel Feher, Didier Gille, Isabelle Stengers, Contre-temps: Les pouvoirs de l'argent, Editions Michel de Maule (2015/1988). (ISBN 2876230283 et 978-2876230286).
- (with Cette-France-là) Xénophobie d'en haut: le choix d'une droite éhontée. Paris, La Découverte, 2012. (ISBN 9782707173317).
- (with Cette-France-là) Sans-papiers et préfets: la culture du résultat en portraits. Paris, La Découverte, 2012. (ISBN 9782707173300).
- Conjurations de la violence: introduction à la lecture de Georges Bataille, Presses universitaires de France (PUF) 1981. (ISBN 2130366996).

=== Articles in French ===
- « La lutte sociale se joue désormais sur les marchés financiers : Entretien avec Michel Feher », Alternatives Economiques (15/05/2018).
- « Quand le capitalisme change de direction », AOC, 01.06.18.
- « Pourquoi et comment faire des marchés financiers le nouveau foyer des luttes sociales », Ivan du Roy avec Michel Feher, Basta, 20 Octobre 2017.
- « Don, échange, partage : esquisse et croisement de deux projets », Mouvements, des idées et des luttes (26 mai 2015).
- « Que deviennent les arts d'aimer avec le néolibéralisme? Entretien avec Michel Feher », recueillis par Catherine Achin et Olivier Roueff, Mouvements, 2015 Issue 2, number 82, 148-158.
- « Le Proche-Orient hors les murs. Usages français du conflit israélo-palesinien «, De la question sociale à la question raciale ? Représenter la société française. Didier Fassin et Eric Fassin, La Découverte, 2006.
- « Politique non gouvernementale », Vacarme, n° 34, janvier 2006. Collectif dirigé par Michel Feher.
- « Violences dans et hors l'école, quelles responsabilités ? » de Michel Feher, Roger Dadoun, Bruno Mattéi, et Dominique Gelin. Sciences de l'homme et Sociétés, N° 70, Septembre 2004: Cultures en mouvement, Revue Cultures. (ISBN 2752000669)
