= Peter Friese =

German art historian and curator (born 1952)

Peter Friese (born 23 March 1952, Siemianowice Śląskie, Poland), is a German art historian and curator.

== Life and education ==
Friese studied art history, archaeology and philosophy at the Ruhr University Bochum, Germany.

His professional life began 1975 at Kunstmuseum Bochum, 1978 at Museum Folkwang and 1980–1984 at Kunsthalle Düsseldorf. He was a co-founder and curator of the "Kunstraum Wuppertal". Since 1988 he has continued his curatorial work at Kunstverein Ruhr in Essen.

In 1992 Peter Friese became curator at Neues Museum Weserburg Bremen and since 2007 he served as chief curator und deputy director. In 2015 he became the museum's director.

Since 1994 he lectures on art history and cultural sciences at Bremen University.

== Curatorial work ==
As artistic director of the Kunstverein Ruhr he curated a great number of one-person exhibitions, among others with Werner Ruhnau, Gary Hill, VA Wölfl, Christian Boltanski, Ingo Günther Lawrence Weiner, Terry Fox, Timm Ulrichs, Gerhard Richter, Anna und Bernhard Blume, and Tony Cragg.

As chief curator of Neuen Museums Weserburg Bremen he conceptualized and realized his most successful exhibition project “MINIMAL MAXIMAL” (1998-1999), covering Minimal Art and its impact on contemporary art of the 1990s. The exhibition travelled to Santiago de Compostela, Spain Centro Galego de Arte Contemporanea and in 2001 to Japan to three museums: the Chiba City Museum of Art, Japan, MoMAK, National Museum of Modern Art, Kyoto and the Fukuoka City Museum of Art, Fukuoka, Japan. In 2002 the National Museum of Contemporary Art in Seoul showed the exhibition. The catalog was published and translated into five languages.

Other seminal exhibition projects, all of them originating at the Weserburg museum, include “Kunst nach Kunst” (Art After Art), “After Images”, 2004 “Farbe im Fluss" (Color in Flux)”, 2001; “Ohne Zögern (Without Hesitation)” und 2008 bis 2010 “Go for it!” (Collection Olbricht); "Say it isn't so", 2007.

== Publications ==
- "MINIMAL MAXIMAL, Minimal Art and its influence on international art of the 90s". with Thomas Deecke, Gregor Stemmrich, Stephan Schmidt- Wulffen, Margrit Brehm and others, Catalog Neues Museum Weserburg Bremen, Heidelberg, Germany 1998, ISBN 3-8295-7004-X
- "Ohne Zögern, Die Sammlung Olbricht Teil 2", catalog published by Neues Museum Weserburg Bremen ISBN 978-3-926318-09-1
- FÜNFZIG JAHRE, Kunstverein Ruhr - Tatkreis Kunst der Ruhr, with Oliver Scheytt, Claudia Heinrich, Anita Ruhnau, Friederike Wappler, Dieter Eberle, Werner Filthaut, Essen 2000, ISBN 978-3-9803846-9-8
- "After Images", Neues Museum Weserburg Bremen, 2004, ISBN 3-937577-84-X
- "Kunst nach Kunst", Exhibition Catalog, Neues Museum Weserburg Bremen, with Guido Boulboullé, Thomas Deecke, Raimar Stange, Gregor Stemmrich and others. Edited by Peter Friese, Neues Museum Weserburg Bremen, Hauschild Verlag, 2002, ISBN 3-89757-162-5
