= Herman de Vries =

Dutch artist

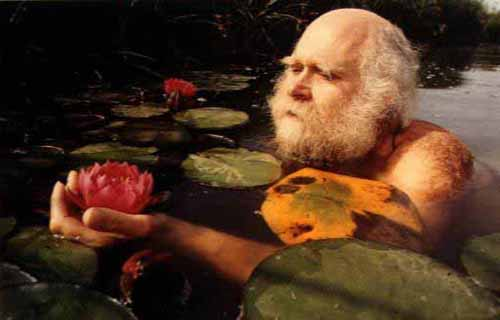
Herman de Vries

Herman de Vries (born 11 July 1931 in Alkmaar) is a Dutch artist. He typically stylises his name in lower-case as herman de vries on his artwork 'to avoid hierarchy'. De Vries works and lives with his wife Susanne in Eschenau near Knetzgau, Germany.

De Vries began making art on the theme of "nature and plants" in 1953. He began painting in the late 1950s.

One of his installations, from May 2002, is an explicit critique of Saint Boniface and his felling of the Donar Oak: he planted, on the bank of the Rhine in Düsseldorf, a 7-metre oak tree surrounded by a palisade of cast-iron, gold-tipped spears. Along the palisade is written, in Latin, wynfrith me caesit--herman me recreavit ("Wynfrid cut me down, herman resurrected me").

In 1993, as part of that year's World Horticultural Exposition in Stuttgart, de Vries created Sanctuarium, a small forest also enclosed by a circular palisade consisting of gold-tipped spears, in this case of wrought iron. His intention was for it to remain undisturbed, but the city parks department cleared the land in 2018 as part of a policy of periodic pruning. He and two other artists said they would take legal action against the city. A similar installation by de Vries in Münster is enclosed by a brick wall.
