= Palais Wittgenstein (Düsseldorf) =

Theatre in Düsseldorf, North Rhine-Westphalia, Germany

Coordinates: 51.22241°N 6.77263°E

Palais Wittgenstein (Düsseldorf) is a theatre in Düsseldorf, North Rhine-Westphalia, Germany. Originally built in the 18th century, when it served as the residency for the Wittgenstein family. Nowadays it is used for a wide variety of performances.
