= Irma Blank =

German-born Italian artist (1934–2023)

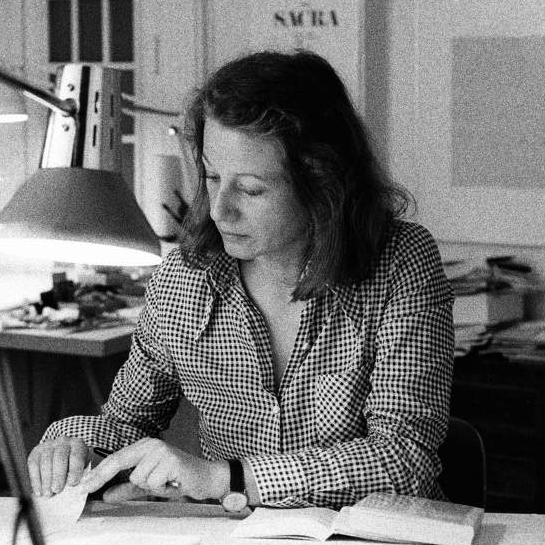
- Blank in her studio in Milan, c. 1970
- Born: 1934; Celle, German Reich
- Died: 14 April 2023 (aged 88); Milan, Italy
- Occupation: Artist

Irma Blank (1934 – 14 April 2023) was a German-born Italian artist. Her work, based on printed text that she transcribed in ink, has been described as "drawing languages without words" and thus "a form of communication beyond specific language", including sounds.

== Life and work ==
Blank was born in Celle, Lower Saxony. In 1955, age 20 and inspired by Johann Wolfgang von Goethe's Italian Journey, she traveled to Syracuse, Sicily. Having made the decision to settle in Italy for good, Blank started working as a high school teacher, focusing on her own art at night. In 1973 Blank moved to Milan, where she met with the concrete poetry artists and introduced language into her prints and paintings. In the 1970s she initiated a long-standing collaboration with fellow artist Mirella Bentivoglio. Blank's technique in Trascrizioni, a cycle of works she started in 1973 and concluded in 1979, was to transcribe texts from printed material, such as newspapers, poetry and treatises, in black ink on transparent paper. During the process, she would "read" the material in monotonous sounds with her mouth closed, which she then recorded.

Although Blank's work was exhibited at Documenta 6 in Kassel in 1977 and the 38th Venice Biennale in 1978, her practice experienced a period of relative obscurity until it was reidiscovered and reappraised in the 2010s.

Blank wrote in 2001:

I save writing from its enslavement to sense: writing purified of sense. I return to the zero point, the semantic zero, the semantic void: silence as a germinating source. ...
I give autonomy back to the sign, to the body of writing, in order to give voice to the silence, to the void. To the thoughts unthought. Writing is not linked to knowing, but to being. Writing is the home of being. ...
Nonverbal writing, writing that remains in silence, original truth. ...
Writing, place of perdition and discovery.

In 2017 Blank's work was exhibited at the 57th Venice Biennale. A travelling retrospective curated by Johana Carrier and Joana P. R. Neves. was staged at the Culturgest in Lisbon and MAMCO in Geneva in 2019, at the CAPC musée d'art contemporain de Bordeaux, the CCA Tel Aviv-Yafo and the Bauhaus Foundation Tel Aviv in 2020, at the Museo civico Villa dei Cedri in Bellinzona, the Bombas Gens Centre d'Art in Valencia in 2021, and at the ICA (Institute of Contemporary Art) in Milan in 2021. An extensive monograph was published by Walther König in Cologne.

Blank died in Milan on 14 April 2023, at the age of 88.

== Selected exhibitions ==
Blank's works have been presented in solo and group exhibitions, including:

- 1977: Metamorphosen des Buches, Documenta 6, Kassel
- 1978: Materializzazione del linguaggio, 38th Venice Biennale
- 1979: Sprachen jenseits von Dichtung, Westfälischer Kunstverein, Münster
- 1981: 16th São Paulo Art Biennial
- 1989: Konfrontation 1974–1989, Bonner Kunstverein
- 1992: Geteilte Bilder. Das Diptychon in der neuen Kunst. Museum Folkwang, Essen
- 1992: Kunstsache, Kunstmuseum, Düsseldorf
- 1997: Augenzeugen, Die Sammlung Hanck, Kunstmuseum, Düsseldorf
- 2010: Modernités plurielles de 1905 à 1970, Centre Pompidou, Paris
- 2011: Irma Blank & Silvie Defraoui: Writings Galleria Michela Rizzo, Venedig
- 2012: Le mie parole, e tu? Galleria dell'Incisione, Brescia
- 2013: Senza Parole P420
- 2017: 57th Venice Biennale
- 2019: Culturgest, Lisbon
- 2019: MAMCO, Geneva
- 2019: CAPC musée d'art contemporain de Bordeaux
- 2020: CCA Tel Aviv-Yafa
- 2020: Bauhaus Foundation Tel Aviv
- 2021: Bombas Gens|es Centre d'Art, Valencia
- 2021: ICA (Institute of Contemporary Art), Milan
- 2021: Museo Villa dei Cedri, Bellinzona
