= Artist's multiple =

Series of identically-made art objects

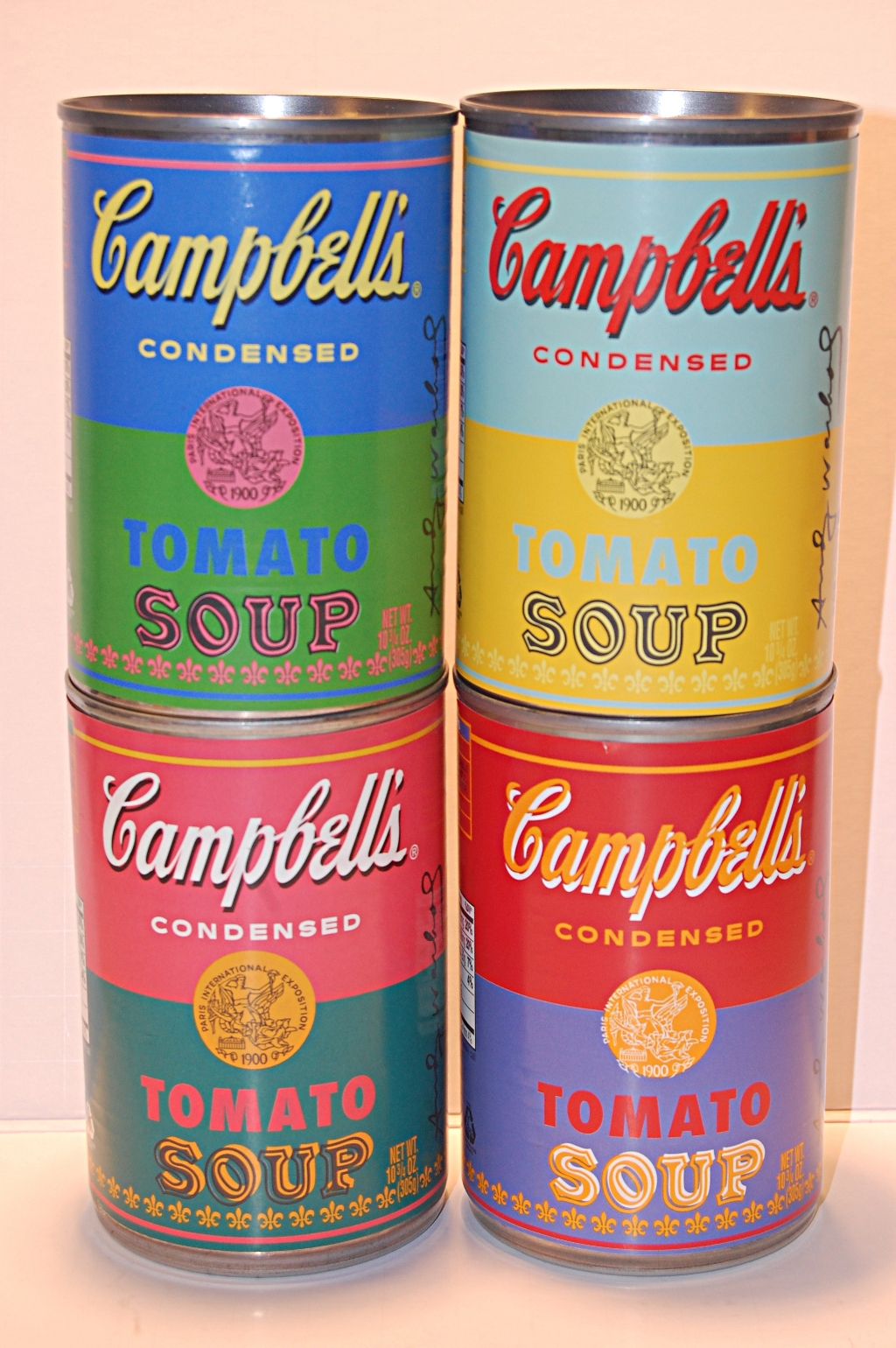
Soup cans with labels of slightly varying colors but similar designs

Artist's multiple is a series of identical art objects produced by or for an artist to their design, usually a signed limited edition made specifically for selling. All the traditional forms of art print, such as woodcuts or engravings, can be described as "multiples", but the term is especially used for cheap forms in contemporary art, and in American English.

Multiples have been described as among the most accessible and affordable forms of contemporary art on the market.. They may take the form of a 2D print, 3D sculpture or installation piece. Producing work as multiple allows artists to reach a wider market while maintaining the work's artistic integrity.

Multiples are united by their lack of uniqueness, usually regarded as a prerequisite in a work of art. Many are by artists who work solely with the concept of the multiple. The challenge to the artist is in finding ways of realizing an idea that can be repeated time and again. Thus part of the creative challenge comes in researching new methods and sourcing new materials, leading to some unlikely collaborations between artist and fabricators.

== History ==
The old master print has a history dating back to the 15th century; many types were originally cheap and sold to a wide market, especially religious subjects sold to pilgroims as pilgrimage souvenirs. William Morris and Walter Crane were using mass production methods to take art to the masses true to their socialist ideals in the 19th century.

Marcel Duchamp's ready-mades elevated everyday objects to works of art by the act of signing them. His 1935 work Rotoreliefs, a set of six rotating optical discs, which were issued in an edition of 500 is one of the first true artists' multiples.

Joseph Beuys (1921–1986) took the multiple idea further. Disillusioned by the approach to everyday objects manifested by Fluxus, Beuys wanted to reclaim the role of the object as art. He felt that as an artist he could channel energy from everyday objects and imbue them with new power and meaning. Wolf Vostells first multiple Do it yourself was published in 1963 to go with his show at the Smolin Gallery.

In 1993, artists Sarah Lucas and Tracey Emin took over a disused shop in London's East End and, with other artists friends including Damien Hirst, sold T-shirts, mugs and other customized items as works of art. This artist-led approach to selling art directly to the public not only re-popularised the artists multiple, but was a key moment in the subsequent Young British Artist era, culminating in the Charles Saatchi collected "Sensation" exhibition.

Since 2005, there have been vending machines produced by the association Un Certain Détachement from Grenoble, France. The association was founded by artists Mary Veale, Claude Gazengel and Alain Quercia in 2005. There have been 40 contemporary artists making multiples in video, books, sculpture, design etc. All are works are individually signed and numbered and displayed in shows throughout France, including the 2011 Biennale d'art contemporain de Lyon.

== Limited editions ==
In printmaking, a limited edition is normally hand signed and numbered by the artist, typically in pencil, in the form (e.g.): 14/100. The first number is the number of the individual copy of the print . The second number is the "edition size" or number of prints the artist will print of that image. The lower the second number is, the more valuable and collectible the limited editions are likely to be, within whatever their price range is. A small number, up to say 25, of "artists' proofs" are usually produced as well, signed and with "AP", "proof", etc. Prints that are given to someone or are for some reason unsuitable for sale are marked "H. C." or "H/C", meaning "hors de commerce", not for sale. The printer will typiccally retain a number of proofs, often not signed by the artist.

== US consumer protection laws ==
California became the first state to regulate the sale of artist's multiples and limited edition art prints with the "California Print Law" of 1971. The state of Illinois later expanded on the California statute. However, it was not until 1986 that more comprehensive provisions, still in place today, were enacted with the passage of the "Georgia Print Law". That law became the template for statutes subsequently enacted by other states.

The Georgia Print Law written by (former) State Representative Chesley V. Morton, became effective July 1, 1986. The law requires art dealers, artists, or auctioneers to supply information to prospective purchasers about the nature of the print, the number of prints and editions (including HC editions) produced, and the involvement (if any) of the artist in the creation of the print. The penalty for violation of the law ranges from simple reimbursement to treble damages, in the case of a willful violation. Those found to be in violation of the law are also liable for court costs, expenses, and attorney fees. The law applies to works of art valued at more than $100.00 (not including frame). Charitable organizations are specifically exempt from the provision of the law. The statute of limitations is one year after discovery, and, if discovery of the violation is not made within three years of the sale, then the purchaser's remedies are extinguished.

== See also ==
- Historical editions (music)
- Print run
- Special edition
