= Ulises Carrión =

Mexican conceptual artist and writer

Ulises Carrión (1941, San Andres Tuxtla, Mexico – 1989, Amsterdam, the Netherlands), considered as "perhaps Mexico’s most important conceptual artist", is widely known for his decisive role in defining and conceptualizing the artistic genre of artists' book through his manifesto The New Art of Making Books (1975). But his awareness and interest in new forms of art and innovative operations suggests that he was active in most of the artistic fields of his time.

His activities include the creation of artworks, the development of theory, and the generation of multiple independent initiatives. Carrión's works include not only a great number of bookworks - as he named artists' books - and unique artworks, but also performances, film, video, and sound works. Carrión also did several editing, publishing, and curation projects, a couple of notable public projects, and various significant works and initiatives within the international community of mail artists during its most creative period. Equally essential for his artistic career is his engagement in several artists' run spaces. All his artistic activities are based on his detailed and rigorous theories.

== Career ==
Carrión was born in San Andres Tuxtla, Veracruz, Mexico in 1941. After studying philosophy and literature at the National University of Mexico, he started his career as a successful and respected young writer. In 1964 he received a grant for further studies at the Sorbonne in Paris, France. Shortly afterwards he went to study at the Goethe Institute in Achenmühle, Germany, and to Leeds, England, where he studied English language and literature at the University and graduated with a diploma.

In 1972 he definitively settled in Amsterdam, an open and cosmopolitan city with a lot of artistic innovation and international exchanges. Here he became co-founder and member of the In-Out Center (1972-1974). During his tenure at In-Out Center, Carrión used a mimeograph machine to self-publish several artists' books under the imprint In-Out Productions, including Sonnet(s), Tell me what sort of wallpaper your room has and I will tell you who you are, and Amor, la palabra. He also held his first solo exhibition, Texts and Other Texts, at the In-Out Center from May 28-June 9, 1973.

In 1975, he founded Other Books and So, the first space of its kind devoted to all varieties of artists’ publications, which in 1979 became the Other Books And So Archive. He was also the co-founder of the Vereniging van Videokunstenaars, later Time Based Arts (1983-1993) in Amsterdam, NL. Ulises Carrión died in 1989 in Amsterdam.

== Recent Reception ==
Due to a certain cult of the overlooked and underestimated (post-)1960s avant-garde, Ulises Carrión has undergone an extraordinary appreciation in the 21st century. Exhibitions of his works and a flood of references to his artistic strategies and theories appear in current art works, essays, and conferences. Newly annotated, listed, translated, and edited works are further proof of renewed scholarly interest. The widespread reception of his manifesto The New Art of Making Books made him the central reference for the definition of the concept of the artist book. Also his bookshop gallery Other Books and So became, despite its short duration, a mythologized paragon. Ulises Carrión has long been recognized as an important conceptual compatriot to artists in Latin America.

== Exhibitions ==
- Die Neue Kunst des Büchermachens, Weserburg, Bremen, 1992
- We have Won! Haven't we?, Museum Fodor, Amsterdam, 1992
- ¿Mundos personales o estrategias culturales?, Museo de Arte Carrillo Gil, 2002
- Ulises Carrión e a sua Livraria, Serralves, Porto, 2010
- Gossip, Scandal and Good Manners: Works by Ulises Carrión, The Showroom, London, 2010
- Dear Reader. Don't Read, Museo Nacional Centro de Arte Reina Sofía, Madrid, 2016 Museo Jumex, Mexico-City, 2017
- Ulises Carrión: Bookworks and Beyond, Princeton University Library, Princeton, NJ, 2024

== Artists' books and other writings (Incomplete Selection) ==
- Carrión, Ulises. De Alemania, Mexico, 1970
- Carrión, Ulises, Ed., From Bookworks to Mailworks, Other Books and So, Amsterdam, 1978
- Carrión, Ulises. In Alphabetical Order, Cres Publishers, Amsterdam; Agora Studio, Maastricht, [1979]
- Carrión, Ulises. The Muxlows, Verlaggalerie Leaman, [Darmstadt], 1978
- Carrión, Ulises. Mirror box, Stempelplaats Amsterdam, 1979
- Carrión, Ulises. Rubber Stamp Books, Lomholt Formular Press, Odder, 1979
- Carrión, Ulises. Namen en adressen, Agora Studio, Maastricht, 1980
- Carrión Ulises. Second Thoughts, VOID Distributors, Amsterdam, 1980
- Carrión, Ulises and Agius, Juan J., Ed., Beeld Boeken, Galerie da Costa, Amsterdam, 1980
- Carrión Ulises, and Crozier Robin, et al., Kunst in der Öffentlichkeit, Marode Editions, Würzburg, 1981
- Carrión Ulises, The New Art of Making Books. Nicosia : Aegean editions, 2001.

A catalogue raisonne of Carrión's artists' books and related works was published by Document Art Gallery, Buenos Aires, in 2013.
