= Weserburg =

Modern art museum in Bremen, Germany

Coordinates: 53°4′35″N 8°47′56″E

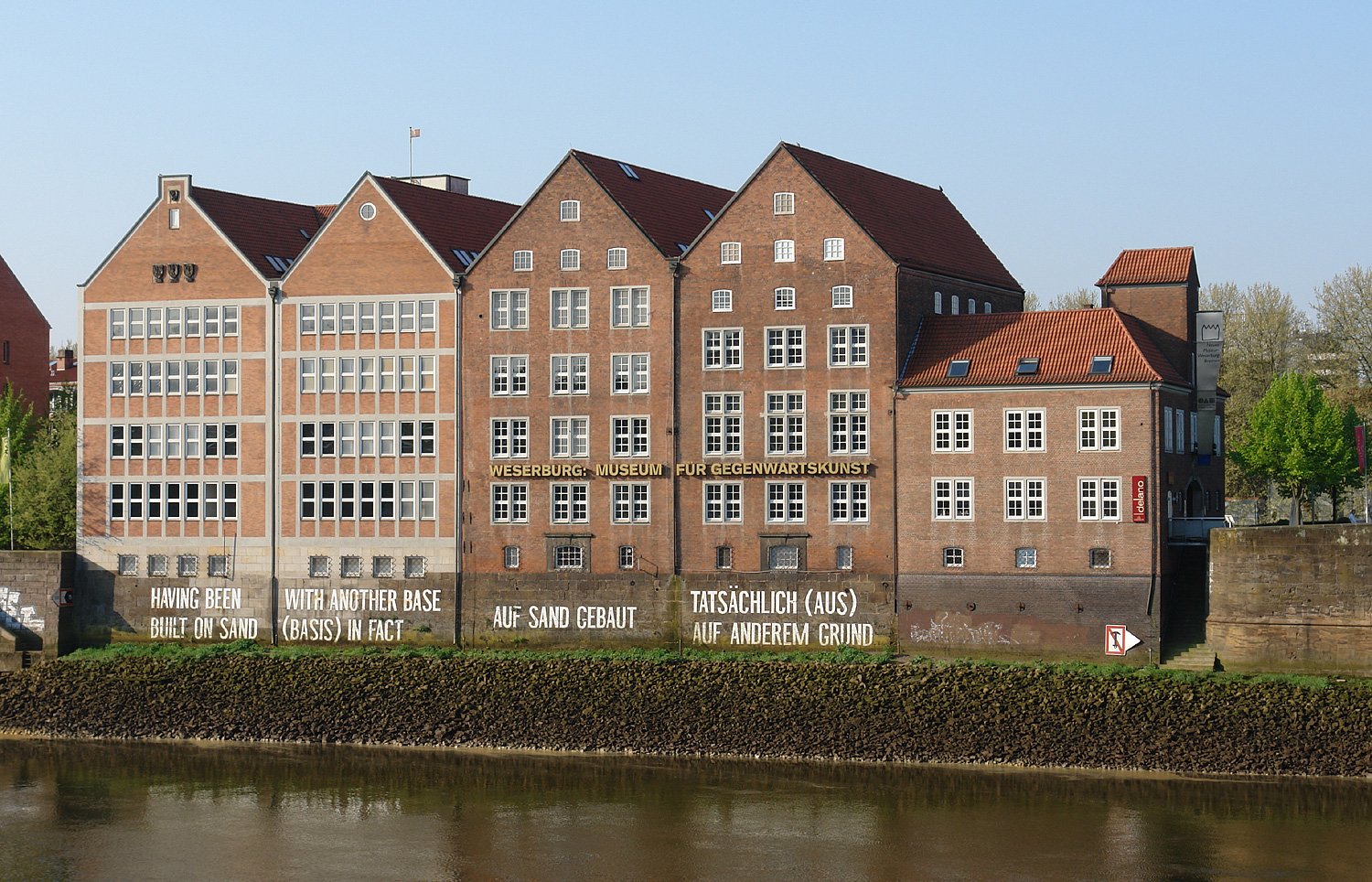
The Weserburg, Bremen's modern art museum

Weserburg, Bremen

The Weserburg is a modern art museum in Bremen, Germany. Opened in 1991, it is located on the Teerhof peninsula next to the River Weser in an old factory building which was almost completely destroyed in the Second World War. Originally known as "New Museum Weserburg Bremen" (Neues Museum Weserburg Bremen), it was Europe's first "collectors' museum", in that it conserves no permanent collection but mounts changing exhibition of private collections. It is one of the largest modern art museum spaces in Germany.

== History ==
In 1893, a cigarette factory was opened by Ad. Hagens & Co. on the Teerburg Peninsula in the middle of the Weser. Known as Hagensburg, the building's two Neogothic gate towers contrasted with the surrounding warehouses. After the Schilling Brothers (Gebrüder Schilling) acquired the building in 1923 for a coffee factory, the name was changed to Weserburg. Almost totally destroyed in the Second World War, the building was repaired and reopened in 1949. When the factory closed in 1973, the building was sold to the city. It was used for various cultural purposes including artists' ateliers and art exhibitions, until it was decided it should become a collectors' museum.

In November 1988, the Bürgerschaft of Bremen voted in favour of founding the New Museum Weserburg. The founding members were the City of Bremen, the Bremen Art Association and several collectors. The conversion of building was completed in 1991 under the supervision of architect Wolfram Dahms, providing 6,000 m^{2} (65,000 sq ft) of exhibition space. The New Museum Weserburg opened in September 1991 as the first instance of a collectors' museum in which all the artefacts were from private lenders. The director, Thomas Deecke (1991 - 2005), was instrumental in securing notable collections from Germany and abroad. In January 2007, the name was changed to Weserburg | Museum of Modern Art (Weserburg | Museum für moderne Kunst).

== The museum ==
The museum has exhibited works from the most influential contemporary artists in its rather unusual premises. Exhibitions from European collectors large and small have provided insights into contemporary art. The interest of the collectors combines with the atmosphere of the museum to provide an integrated experience.

In November 2013, there was a suggestion the museum could possibly be moved to the green area in the Cultural Mile (Kulturmeile) behind the Wilhelm Wagenfeld House which would bring it close to the Kunsthalle, facilitating cooperation between the two institutions. However, there are now plans (2014) to extend the museum which will remain permanently on the peninsula. Citing structural and conceptional differences in the approach between a traditional museum such as the Kunsthalle Bremen and the collectors' museum for which the Weserburg is a shining example the current director Peter Friese has strongly argued for a continued independence of the Weserburg Museum.
