= China's New Art, Post-1989 =

China's New Art, Post-1989 was the first major collection of Chinese experimental art to exhibit outside the country. The exhibition took place between January 30 to February 28, 1993, as part of Hong Kong Arts Festival in Hong Kong City Hall and at Pao Galleries, Hong Kong Arts Centre. The touring exhibition travelled to Taipei, Melbourne, London, Vancouver, and various cities in the US from 1993 to 1997.

Considered a seminal snapshot of the Chinese avant-garde scene of the time, the exhibition served as an inspiration for the exhibition "Art and China after 1989: Theatre of the World" presented in 2017 at the Guggenheim Museum in New York.

== Curators ==
The exhibition was curated by Chang Tsongzung Johnson, 張頌仁 and Li Xianting, 栗憲庭, with assistant curator Liao Wen. The Hong Kong exhibition curator was Oscar Ho Hing-Kay. The show included an "extraordinary roll-call" of artists, such as Wang Guangyi, Gu Wenda, Fang Lijun, and Zeng Fanzhi.

Curator Chang Tsongzung wrote, "The art of the Post-1989 period was significant as it characterised the spirit of the new decade, closing the chapter of the 1980s. It was important also for the fact that it presented to the world the first major coherent overview of China's experimental art scene, and has maintained a continuing dialogue ever since."

A catalog of the exhibition, edited by Valerie C. Doran and featuring a preface by Chang Tsongzung, offers an in-depth study of the artistic undercurrents and cultural sensibilities for the creation of experimental art in China during the late 1980s and the early 1990s, through contributions from a number of noted critics and art historians. The original publisher Hanart TZ Gallery has donated the publication rights of the book to Asia Art Archive.

== Artists ==
The exhibition included works by Ah Xian, 阿仙; CAI Jin, 蔡錦; Chen Haiyan, 陳海燕; DING Fang, 丁方; DING Yi, 丁乙; FANG Lijun, 方力鈞; FENG Mengbo, 馮夢波; FU Zhongwang, 傅中望; GENG Jianyi, 耿建翌; GU Dexin, 顧德新; GU Wenda, 谷文達; GUAN Wei, 關偉; GUO Wei, 郭偉; HE Sen, 何森; HONG Hao, 洪浩; HUANG Yan, 黃岩; LI Shan, 李山; LIU Dahong, 劉大鴻; LIU Ming, 劉鳴; LIU Wei, 劉煒; LIU Xiaodong, 劉小東; LU Shengzhong, 呂勝中; MAO Xuhui, 毛旭輝; NI Haifeng, 倪海峰; PAN Dehai, 潘德海; QIU Shihua, 邱世華; QIU Zhijie, 邱志傑; REN Jian, 任戩; SHANG Yang, 尚揚; SHEN Qin, 沈勤; SHEN Xiaotong, 沈小彤; SONG Yonghong, 宋永紅; SUI Jianguo, 隋建國; TANG Song, 唐宋; The New Measurement Group, 新刻度小組; WANG Chuan, 王川; WANG Guangyi, 王廣義; WANG Huaxiang, 王華祥; WANG Jianwei, 汪建偉; WANG Jinsong, 王勁松; WANG Youshen, 王友身; WANG Ziwei, 王子衛; WEI Guangqing, 魏光慶; WU Shanzhuan, 吳山專; XIA Xiaowan, 夏小萬; XIAO Lu, 肖魯; XIN Haizhou, 忻海洲; XU Anming, 徐安明; XU Bing, 徐冰; YE Yongqing, 葉永青; YU Youhan, 余友涵; ZENG Fanzhi, 曾梵志; ZHANG Bo, 張波; ZHANG Peili, 張培力; ZHANG Xiaogang, 張曉剛; ZHANG Yongjian, 張永見; ZHOU Chunya, 周春芽; and ZHOU Jirong, 周吉榮
