= Vladislav Sludskiy =

Vladislav Sludskiy is a Kazakh art consultant and curator. He is the co-founder and curator of the Eurasian Cultural Alliance, a non-profit organisation dedicated to promoting the development of Kazakh contemporary art; and the organiser of the art collecting online platform Qazart.com. He is the former director and curator of the Ethan Cohen Gallery in New York and a former senior art consultant at the Singapore-based Metis Art Education. In 2010, he co-founded ARTBAT FEST, a contemporary arts festival based in Almaty, which ran annually until 2023. From 2026, he has served as the chief curator of the newly-formed TOVA foundation, a Geneva-based non-profit aimed at making Kazakh art publicly accessible.

Sludskiy's curational work and articles have been published in international magazines including The Brooklyn Rail, The Huffington Post, ArtAsiaPacific, Buro 24/7 and Esquire. In 2018, he was a contributor to the anthology, Can Art Aid in Resolving Conflicts: 100 perspectives. In 2021, he was nominationed for Forbes Kazakhstan's 30 under 30 list for achievements in the field of arts and culture.

== Life and career ==
Sludskiy was born in Almaty, Kazakhstan.

In 2011, he enrolled in a bachelor's program at Long Island University in New York to study cultural management. In 2015, while completing his degree, he interned at the Gagosian Gallery, through which he met collector and art dealer Ethan Cohen. From 2016 to 2019, Sludskiy worked as director and curator of the Ethan Cohen Gallery, organising exhibitions featuring artists including Ai Weiwei, Xu Bing, Andy Warhol, Yayoi Kusama, Qiu Zhijie and Zhang Huan.

Between 2010 and 2023, Sludskiy was involved in organising ARTBAT FEST, an Almaty-based annual arts festival which he co-founded with his father. The project began as a public exhibition of sculptures installed across the city centre, and became increasingly ambitious in subsequent years, working with international artists and involving indoor exhibitions, theatre performances and educational programs. From 2011, it was run by the newly-formed non-profit the Eurasian Cultural Alliance, of which Sludskiy was also a co-founder. Over its 8 years run, over 250 artists and curators from 26 countries took part in the festival including Tatzu Nishi, Walid Siti, and Tima Radya.

Through the Eurasian Cultural Alliance, Sludskiy has been involved in other initiatives, including exhibitions at the PERMM Museum of Contemporary Art in Perm; the Strasbourg Museum of Modern and Contemporary Art in Strasbourg; Alserkal Avenue in Dubai; Jeonbuk Museum of Art in Jeonbuk; the National Museum of the Republic of Kazakhstan and the Museum of Future Energy in Astana; and the Kasteyev Museum of Fine Art in Almaty. The organisation sourced and supervised the construction of four sculptures by Andrew Rogers, Saken Narynov and Marc Fornes for EXPO 2017 in Astana.

The ECA has received funding from both national and international organisations including the National Museum of the Republic of Kazakhstan, the Goethe Institute, the British Council, the Soros Foundation Kazakhstan, Chevron, InDrive and the Caspian Arts Foundation.

In 2018, as a part of Asia Contemporary Art Week, Sludskiy co-curated an exhibition on the work of art collective Kyzyl Tractor with Leeza Ahmady at MANA Contemporary in New Jersey. In 2019, Sludskiy founded Qazart, an online art collecting platform centred on Central Asia. The same year, he began working as an independent art consultant. In 2024, Sludskiy completed a Master's degree in Arts and Cultural Management at the International University of Catolonia.

In 2026, Sludskiy was announced as the chief curator of the TOVA Foundation, a newly created non-profit aimed at spreading and promoting Kazakh art, presided over by Togzhan Izbassarova, the wife of French businessman and billionaire, David Wertheimer, who co-owns Chanel. Wertheimer, alongside art consultant Jean-Olivier Despres and Tatiana de Pahlen, daughter of the Ferrari heir, Margherita Agnelli de Pahlen, appear on the foundation's board. In May 2026, for the Venice Biennale, TOVA exhibited the works of two Kazakh artists, Saule Suleimenova and Sayan Baigaliyev, at the Berggruen foundation-owned Casa dei Tre Oci palace on Giudecca Island.
