= Gravitational Arena =

2022 mixed-media installation by Xu Bing

Gravitational Arena is a mixed-media installation by Chinese artist Xu Bing. Massive in size (25.5 x 15.7 x 15.7 m), the work is composed of 1,600 metal characters from Xu's self-designed, morphed Chinese-English writing system Square Word Calligraphy from 1994-96. Forming a "colossal vortex", individual characters attached to metal netting placed 30 m above ground stretch to the ground level where a mirror reflects the "wormhole"-like structure. Gravity, along with meticulous design and engineering, contributes to the "tensions and contortions" of the calligraphy, which, when paired with the reflections from the mirror below, creates a complex, intriguing viewing experience. The work, created in 2021-2022, was first publicly exhibited in August 2022 to August 2024 in the Museum of Art Pudong (MAP), in Shanghai, China and was commissioned by both Lujiazui Development (Group) Co., Ltd. and MAP. Detailed images of the work can be accessed on the exhibition page on MAP's website.

The work's title, Gravitational Arena (simplified Chinese: 引力剧场; traditional Chinese: 重力劇場; pinyin: Yǐnlì jùchǎng) correlates with the "wormhole" form, and "gravitational" effect creating tension on the structure, as well as the viewing "arena" created by a perpetual "looking" for the works optimal, yet unattainable, viewing point in which all metal characters are fully legible. Situated in MAP's "Exhibition Hall X", the work takes full advantage of the space, as, although individual characters can be legible through reflections on the ground level, as each floor is "ascended", the perspective of the viewer changes, creating a discontinuous viewing experience and reinforcing the "inherent limitation of human vision."

== Production ==
The artwork is composed of 1,600 metal characters from Xu's "calligraphic system" or Chinese-English "species", Square Word Calligraphy, pasted on a massive metal wire vortex frame. The process of installing the artwork, and the additional pieces in the exhibition, "took nearly a month" in a clearly vast, logistically complicated exhibition space. Appearing in exhibition in the Museum of Art Pudong in the Lujiazui locality of Shanghai, China, the work was produced, organized, and commissioned by the Lujiazui Group and the museum they manage, MAP itself. Like any commissioned work, the fact it is commissioned "can often be a double-edged sword for an artist," with "exceptional," outperforming work propelling an artist's reputation and mediocrity acting as a "lingering 'scar.'" However, Xu's installation has proven to be "an example of the former," exemplifying both complexity of form and concept.

== Contextual Understandings ==
=== Xu Bing and Cultural Revolution ===
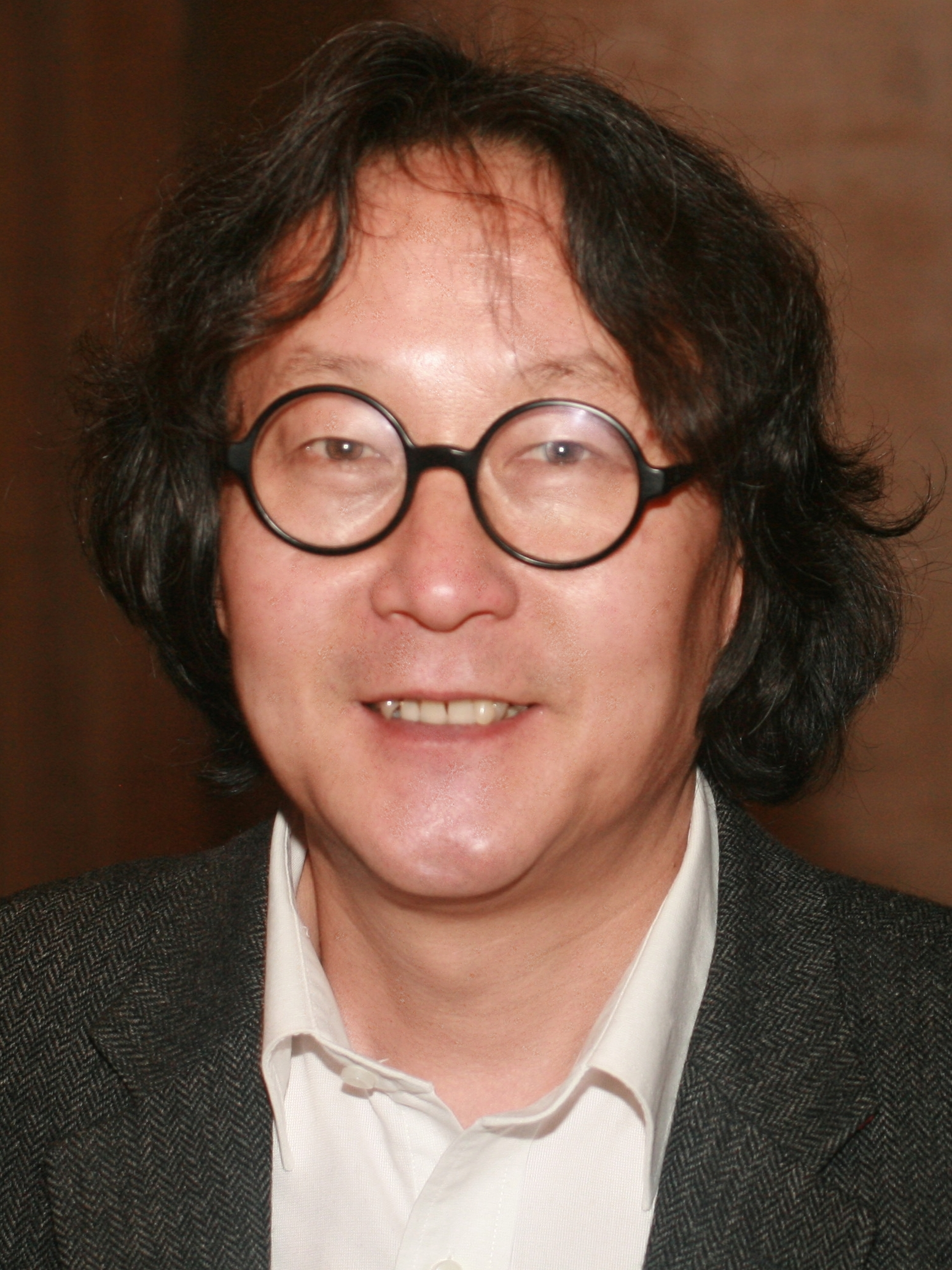
Image of artist Xu Bing

Xu Bing was born in 1955 in Chongqing, China, but was raised in Beijing. Growing up during Chinese Chairman Mao Zedong's Cultural Revolution from 1966 to 1976, in which "Mao led a campaign against intellectuals and the educated classes" to preserve Chinese socialism and eradicate moderate communism and traditionalism, Xu experienced the full force of the assault on intellectualism. In fact, Xu Bing, along with other urban youths, was brought to the countryside as a part of the "Down to the Country Movement", and was "forced to help make "Big Character" propaganda posters" for the Maoist Regime. Additionally, Mao modified traditional Chinese characters to create a "simplified alphabet", hijacking the language and its fundamental place in Chinese culture.

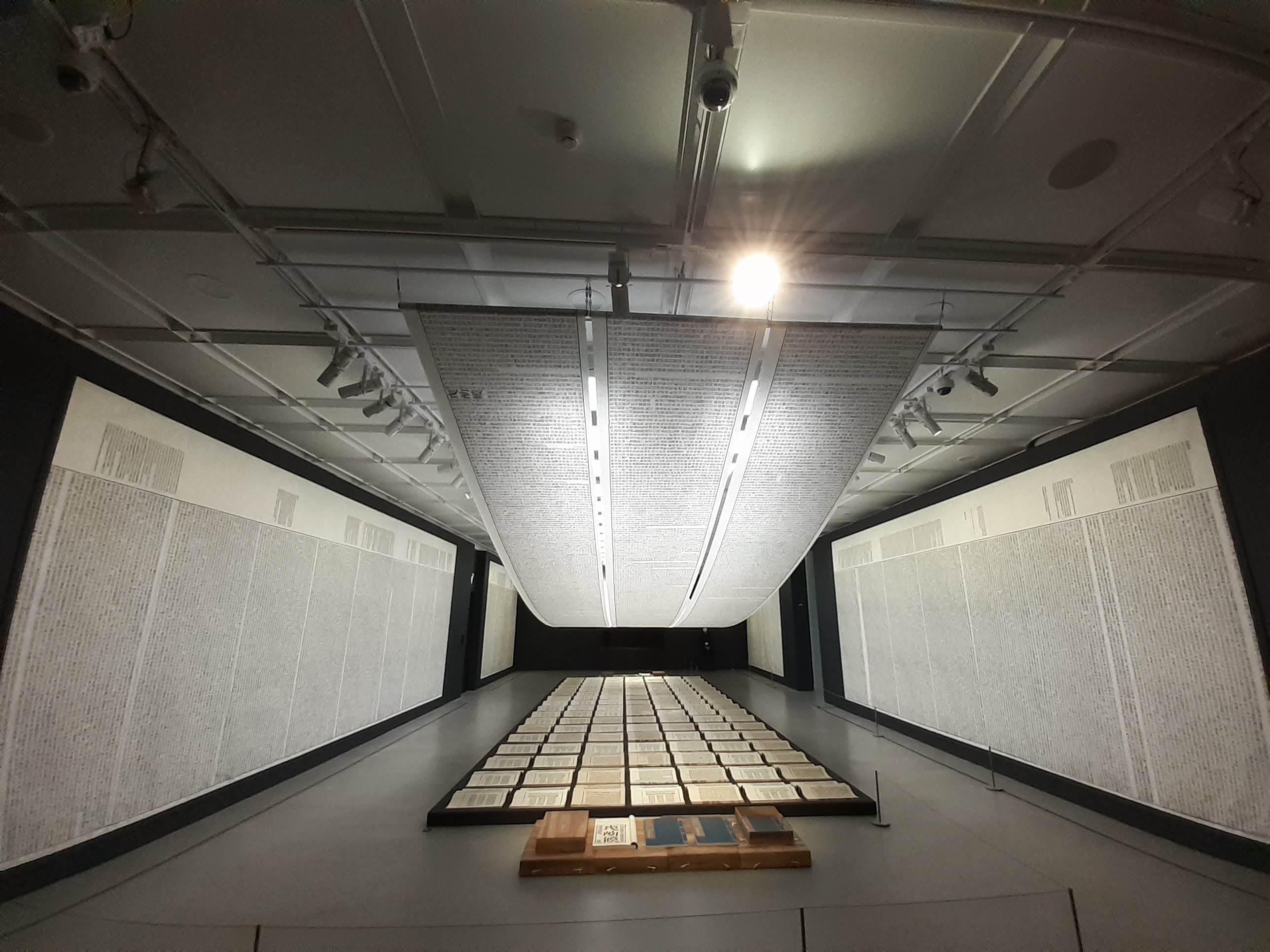
Book from the Sky (Tianshu 天書), ca. 1987–91, displayed at the Hong Kong Museum of Art in October 2020, by Xu Bing

Thus, ideas of censorship and linguistic vitality often appear in Xu's artwork; notably, for example, his acclaimed 1987-1991 book and installation Book from the Sky, in which 4,000 arbitrary, meaningless, but seemingly Chinese characters line the wall of an exhibition space, engulfing viewers in his own teenage feelings of linguistic nullification. After studying at the Central Academy of Fine Arts in Beijing in 1977, becoming faculty, and attaining a graduate degree, Xu and his work gathered acclaim in China, Europe, and the United States, and he continues to express the Chinese language around the world as "modern" and "an avant-garde mentality".

=== Square Word Calligraphy ===
As Xu continued to experiment with language, he developed his own calligraphic system in 1994 called Square Word Calligraphy, emphasizing the modernity of Chinese language by "disguising" English characters through Chinese calligraphy, in turn becoming a "linguistic breeder". Unlike the "nonsensical" script in Book from the Sky, the "'real' text" resolves conflict of "suspicion and confusion in the viewer" and, instead, grants "a usually uninformed audience entre'e into the seemingly secretive and elite Chinese written tradition", introducing "a novel Eastern art form into the Western cultural sphere". In Gravitational Arena, the Square Word Calligraphy that lines the wire vortex is sampled from Austrian Philosopher Ludwig Wittgenstein's Philosophical Investigations from 1953. Wittgenstein points out "a misunderstanding in human cognition resulting from language use". Using these ideas, Xu emphasizes the "seeing" that must be practiced in balance with the systematic "reading" that Wittgenstein enforces to grasp the "genuine aspects of the world".

== Installation Experience ==
=== Viewing ===
Within MAP's Exhibition Hall X, Gravitational Arena can be viewed on five separate levels, starting from the ground level, in which a mirror floor reflects the vortex from above, and then four more ascending levels, each with a rectangular window outlook towards the side of the vortex. In addition to this primary work, several supplementary works can be found on the ground level. The work itself, and the space it's in, is huge, towering 30 meters of height, meaning that no single outlook can witness the entirety of the exhibition space or allow viewers to read the already distorted Square Word Calligraphy. However, as viewers ascend the floors, the characters become increasingly familiar and increasingly legible. Regardless, the warped, wormhole-like vortex of characters defies the two-dimensional "flat-surface" on which we are accustomed to reading, stretching two dimensions into three such that "the ideal viewing perspective becomes non-existent", deeming the entire work an "optical illusion".

=== Conceptual Understanding ===
Through his "distorted textual space", Xu "simultaneously immerses the viewers into an interplay between 'seeing' and 'reading'". On the ground level, the reversed text above is extremely difficult to read, but becomes somewhat legible in the reflection of the mirror that creates a "warped wormhole model" that "interconnects the two inverted spaces." Yet, one is still unable to view the exhibition in its entirety, creating discontinuity of "seeing" and a combination of museum and installation space that has "a theatrically inviting quality." At the top floor, one can finally, legibly see the front of the characters; however, because of the works three-dimensionality, viewers "remain unable to read the body of text as a whole," pushing the "ideal viewing perspective to an unattainable height beyond the confines of the museum" such that it "exists solely on a conceptual level."

As the limitation of human vision acts as a "unique 'material'" in the exhibition space to reflect the "law of perspective" that functions as a "language" for understanding the world, the systematic inclination "to summarize concepts with logic" described by Wittgenstein's passage scribed in Square Word Calligraphy, represents the "disparities and divergent human perspectives" that cause the "ongoing tensions among civilizations." In this way, amidst "a chaos of illegibility," "this creates an arena fraught with tensions and gravitational forces" in which an "ideal perspective" is unattainable, and similarly "all the chaos in the world stems from an unknown purpose—an unseen yet palpable existence."

== Reception ==
Although the work is fairly new, Gravitational Arena has been received well, having gone "far beyond people's expectations, whether in form or content." As a commissioned work, having been produced and organized by both the Lujiazui Group and the Museum of Art Pudong, the artwork has received organizational support, but has also certainly boosted "the artist's reputation in the art community."
