= Hal Hirshorn =

American painter and photographer (1965–2025)

Harold Timothy Hirshorn (January 12, 1965 – February 4, 2025) was an American painter and photographer. Born in Philadelphia, his family often moved due to his father being a Foreign Service Officer. His mother Anne was an art historian and Hirshorn later credited her for influencing his work. He attended Bennington College to study art history and architecture, but dropped out. He briefly studied in Venice with the Peggy Guggenheim Collection. He moved to New York City in 1989.

Hirshorn was well known in the New York art scene, particularly in the East Village, but generally remained aloof from the commercial art market, rarely selling his work. His photographs and paintings were noted for their use of 19th-century techniques and analog methods, such as salt printing and homemade paints, and often depicted landscapes or staged historical scenes, creating what Hirshorn's The New York Times obituary described as "ethereal, haunting images." Notable projects included 2011 recreations of 19th-century funerals, including a series on the 1865 funeral of Seabury Tredwell, a wealthy Manhattanite. Hirshorn's work is characterized by its analog approach, often using antique camera parts and long-exposure techniques to achieve effects. Landscapes employed muted, earthy colors, while his photographic work often staged historical or domestic scenes. He occasionally incorporated theatrical elements, such as makeup, to enhance verisimilitude in his photographs. In 2024, Hirshorn began a project at Pierce Chapel African Cemetery in Midland, Georgia, creating salt prints of staged commemorative funerals for enslaved people buried there. He died before developing the negatives, but collaborators have continued the project posthumously.

After Hirshorn's death, an exhibition of his work was held at Ethan Cohen's two New York galleries. The exhibition was composed of three areas of Hirshorn's work: paintings of clouds and landscapes, salted paper photographic prints of mostly nude women, and large abstract washes of Prussian blue on paper. Hirshorn died aged 60 in Manhattan. His sister said he died of coronary artery disease.
