= 1997 Asian Junior Athletics Championships =

7th Asian Junior Championships
- Dates: 4 – 7 November
- Host city: Bangkok, Thailand
- Level: Junior (under-20)
- Events: 41

The 1997 Asian Junior Athletics Championships was the seventh edition of the international athletics competition for Asian under-20 athletes, organised by the Asian Athletics Association. It took place from 4–7 November in Bangkok, Thailand. A total of 41 events were contested, 22 for male athletes and 19 for female athletes.

== Medal summary ==
=== Men ===
Event	Gold		Silver		Bronze	
100 metres	Gong Wei (CHN)	10.36	Jama Suleiman Yousef (QAT)	10.50	Kazuhiro Tamura (JPN)	10.51
200 metres	Hirofumi Nakagawa (JPN)	20.88 CR	Jama Suleiman Yousef (QAT)	21.03	Kazuhiro Tamura (JPN)	21.06
400 metres	Kim Jae-Da (KOR)	46.45 CR	Hamdan Al-Bishi (KSA)	46.53	Takahiko Yamamura (JPN)	47.21
800 metres	Park Ho-Min (KOR)	1:51.03	Mohamed Osman (KSA)	1:51.45	Narong Nilploy (THA)	1:51.69
1500 metres	Park Ho-Min (KOR)	3:49.53	Chen Fuchun (CHN)	3:49.63	Kiyoharo Sato (JPN)	3:50.28
5000 metres	Zhang Xinkai (CHN)	14:28.78	Sun Wenyong (CHN)	14:29.66	Koji Kimura (JPN)	14:29.71
10,000 metres	Koji Kimura (JPN)	30:03.67	Koji Watanabe (JPN)	30:24.80	Ferry Junaedi (INA)	30:35.15
110 metres hurdles	Cao Jing (CHN)	13.97 w	Liu Xingquan (CHN)	14.28 w	Yusuke Sugiyama (JPN)	14.35 w
400 metres hurdles	Lu Xiaobing (CHN)	51.66	Lin Chin-Fu (TPE)	51.89	Akihiro Yoshioka (JPN)	52.11
3000 metres steeplechase	Sun Wenli (CHN)	9:00.76	Jassim Mohamed (UAE)	9:01.95	Arun D'Souza (IND)	9:04.33
4×100 m relay	Japan (JPN)	39.72 CR	Qatar (QAT)	40.50	Thailand (THA)	40.60
4×400 m relay	Japan (JPN)	3:07.99 CR	Thailand (THA); Jirachai Linglom; C. Mouwdecam; P. Sungnoi; Narong Nilploy	3:08.29	Chinese Taipei (TPE); Yang Teng-Kai; Lin Chin-Fu; Chang Po-Chih; Chen Tien-Wen	3:08.66
10,000 metres walk	Bai Liansheng (CHN)	45:47.61	Sin Il-Yong (KOR)	46:06.06	Tsuyoshi Suzuki (JPN)	46:21.59
High jump	Koji Ishii (JPN)	2.22 m CR	Naoyuki Daigo (JPN)	2.19 m	Li Baibing (CHN)	2.19 m
Pole vault	Xu Gang (CHN)	5.20 m CR	Kim Do-Kyun (KOR)	5.10 m	Koji Hosono (JPN)	5.10 m
Long jump	Abdul Rahman Al-Nubi (QAT)	7.68 m	Gao Zhaoting (CHN)	7.65 m	Chiu Chin-Ching (TPE)	7.53 m
Triple jump	Zhao Zongming (CHN)	16.45 m	Mohamed Adam Mohamed (KSA)	16.10 m	Sergey Bochkov (AZE)	15.77 m
Shot put	Liu Yu (CHN)	17.14 m	Navpreet Singh (IND)	16.16 m	Paramdeep Singh (IND)	15.89 m
Discus throw	Yan Xiaoming (CHN)	53.64 m CR	Abdullah Al-Shammari (KSA)	52.48 m	Lu Ming-Chung (TPE)	48.12 m
Hammer throw	Mei Kun (CHN)	63.00 m	Rupinder Singh Pal (IND)	59.44 m	Kazuhito Yoshima (JPN)	57.84 m
Javelin throw	Yu Nam-Sung (KOR)	72.66 m	Yukifumi Murakami (JPN)	71.18 m	Gu Yong-Hoe (KOR)	69.92 m
Decathlon	Zhao Lei (CHN)	6870 pts	Liu Jun (CHN)	6784 pts	Vitaliy Smirnov (UZB)	6683 pts

=== Women ===
Event	Gold		Silver		Bronze	
100 metres	Chen Shu-Chuan (TPE)	11.70	Chen Haiyan (CHN)	11.80	Yang Xiaoyu (CHN)	11.83
200 metres	Chen Shu-Chuan (TPE)	23.47	Chen Haiyan (CHN)	23.91	Tomomi Suzuki (JPN)	23.96
400 metres	Chen Yuxiang (CHN)	53.10 CR	Li Rui (CHN)	54.67	Lee Ya-Hui (TPE)	54.68
800 metres	Lang Yinglai (CHN)	2:02.66 CR	Lee Ya-Hui (TPE)	2:05.11	Reina Sasaki (JPN)	2:07.24
1500 metres	Lang Yinglai (CHN)	4:18.31	Cui Yuying (CHN)	4:20.24	Kazuko Kanno (JPN)	4:21.18
3000 metres	Lan Lixin (CHN)	9:10.17 CR	Yin Lili (CHN)	9:10.26	Yoshiko Watanabe (JPN)	9:26.76
5000 metres	Yin Lili (CHN)	16:34.67	Lan Lixin (CHN)	16:34.90	Sunita Rani (IND)	16:48.60
100 metres hurdles	Jiang Jinchun (CHN)	13.53	Xu Jia (CHN)	14.14	Yang Li-Chuan (TPE)	14.14
400 metres hurdles	Li Yulian (CHN)	58.09	Li Rui (CHN)	58.60	Chou Ya-Chun (TPE)	59.62
4×100 m relay	Chinese Taipei (TPE); Wang Kuo-huei; Hung Siu-Ting; Tseng Lan-Ying; Chen Shu-Chuan	45.47 CR	India (IND); J. Abraham; Vinita Tripathi; Sathi Geetha; Saraswati Dey	45.89	Japan (JPN)	46.05
4×400 m relay	China (CHN)	3:39.24 CR	Chinese Taipei (TPE); Lo Tsui-Huan; Chou Ya-Chun; Lee Yi-Chuan; Lee Ya-Hui	3:45.54	India (IND)	3:46.39
5000 metres walk	Wang Yuntao (CHN)	21:45.24 CR	Xu Aihui (CHN)	22:40.54	Takako Terui (JPN)	23:23.41
High jump	Tatyana Efimenko (KGZ)	1.77 m	Jeong Mi-Jung (KOR)	1.74 m	Yuko Ono (JPN)	1.74 m
Long jump	Wang Kuo-huei (TPE)	6.56 m CR	Guo Chunfang (CHN)	6.41 m	Lu Ting-Fang (TPE)	6.01 m
Triple jump	Li Jiahui (CHN)	14.23 m CR	Wang Kuo-huei (TPE)	13.26 m	Anna Tarasova (KAZ)	12.99 m
Shot put	Qian Chunhua (CHN)	16.43 m	Sumi Ichioka (JPN)	15.10 m	Li Min (CHN)	14.50 m
Discus throw	Song Aimin (CHN)	55.84 m	Ma Shuli (CHN)	54.84 m	Jang Bok-Shim (KOR)	48.80 m
Javelin throw	Liang Lili (CHN)	58.92 m	Park Ho-hyun (KOR)	54.48 m	Lee Nam-Kyong (KOR)	51.32 m
Heptathlon	Irina Naumenko (KAZ)	5099 pts	Wassana Winatho (THA)	4933 pts	Eri Yamamoto (JPN)	4812 pts

== 1997 Medal Table ==
Rank	Nation	Gold	Silver	Bronze	Total
1	China (CHN)	25	16	3	44
2	Japan (JPN)	5	4	18	27
3	Chinese Taipei (TPE)	4	4	7	15
4	South Korea (KOR)	4	4	3	11
5	Qatar (QAT)	1	3	0	4
6	Kazakhstan (KAZ)	1	0	1	2
7	Kyrgyzstan (KGZ)	1	0	0	1
8	Saudi Arabia (KSA)	0	4	0	4
9	India (IND)	0	3	4	7
10	Thailand (THA)	0	2	2	4
11	United Arab Emirates (UAE)	0	1	0	1
12	Azerbaijan (AZE)	0	0	1	1
12	Indonesia (INA)	0	0	1	1
12	Uzbekistan (UZB)	0	0	1	1
Totals (14 entries)		41	41	41	123
