= Liu Dan (artist) =

Chinese artist born 1953

The family name is Liu.

Liu Dan 刘丹 (born 1953) is a Chinese artist, known for his synthesis of Western and Chinese painting, especially in ink painting.

== Biography ==
Born in Nanjing, Liu studied the Confucian classics, poetry, painting and calligraphy with his grandfather. After the Cultural Revolution he studied traditional Chinese painting under Ya Ming 亚明 (1924-2002) at the Academy of Chinese Painting, Hangzhou, 1978-1981. In 1981 he moved to Hawaii, where he studied Western art, and developed his distinctive style: a combination of classical Chinese painting and photo-realism. In 1992 he moved to New York where he met Ai Weiwei, Xu Bing and other artists from China. In 2006 he returned to China to mentor young artists.

== Exhibitions ==
- 1989 – Honolulu Academy of Arts (solo exhibition)
- 1993 - Contemporary Museum, Honolulu (solo exhibition)
- 1999 – Yale University Art Gallery
- 1999 – Art Institute of Chicago
- 1999 – San Diego Museum of Art (solo exhibition)
- 2004 - Museum of Contemporary Art, Shanghai
- 2005 - Museum für Ostasiatische Kunst in Berlin (solo exhibition)
- 2006 – Metropolitan Museum
- 2006 – Arthur M. Sackler Museum, Harvard University
- 2006 - The 6th Shanghai Biennale
- 2006 – China Institute Gallery, New York
- 2007 – Louisiana Museum of Art, Denmark
- 2008 – Israel Museum, Jerusalem
- 2009 – Princeton University Art Museum
- 2011 – Museum of Fine Arts, Boston
- 2013 – Suzhou Museum, China (solo exhibition)
- 2014 – China Institute Gallery, New York
- 2014 – Metropolitan Museum - Ink Art: Past as Present in Contemporary China
- 2016 – Minneapolis Institute of art (solo exhibition) – Ink Unbound, Paintings by Liu Dan
- 2016 – Ashmolean Museum, Oxford (solo exhibition)
- 2017-2018 – Guggenheim Museum - Art and China after 1989: Theater of the World
- 2019 – Centre Pompidou
