= Cangjie =

Legendary inventor of Chinese writing

- 倉頡
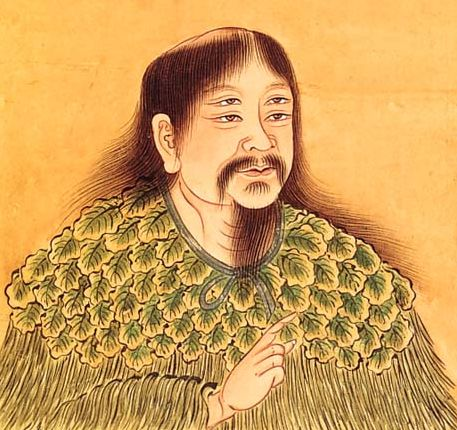
- Portrait of Cangjie
- Died: c. 2,600 BCE, bing 丙 day Youxiong clan
- Occupation: Historian (史)
- Known for: Serving the Yellow Emperor and creating the Han script

Academic background
- Influences: Fuxi

Chinese name
- Traditional Chinese: 倉頡
- Simplified Chinese: 仓颉
- Hanyu Pinyin: Cāngjié
Transcriptions
Standard Mandarin
- Hanyu Pinyin: Cāngjié
- Bopomofo: ㄘㄤ ㄐㄧㄝˊ
- Gwoyeu Romatzyh: Tsangjye
- Wade–Giles: Tsʻang^{1}-chieh^{2}
- IPA: [tsʰáŋ.tɕjě]
Yue: Cantonese
- Yale Romanization: Chōngkit
- Jyutping: Cong1kit3
- IPA: [tsʰɔŋ˥.kʰit̚˧]
Southern Min
- Tâi-lô: Tshong-khiat (lit.); Tshng-khiat (col.)
Middle Chinese
- Middle Chinese: tshang het
Old Chinese
- Zhengzhang: /*sʰaːŋ ɡiːd/

Vietnamese name
- Vietnamese alphabet: Thương Hiệt
- Chữ Hán: 倉頡

Korean name
- Hangul: 창힐
- Hanja: 倉頡
Transcriptions
- Revised Romanization: Changhil

Japanese name
- Kanji: 蒼頡
Transcriptions
- Revised Hepburn: Sōketsu
- Kunrei-shiki: Souketsu

Cangjie is a legendary figure in Chinese mythology, said to have been an official historian of the Yellow Emperor and the inventor of Chinese characters during the Three Sovereigns and Five Emperors period. Legend has it that he had four eyes, and that when he invented the characters, the deities and ghosts cried and the sky rained millet. He is considered a legendary rather than historical figure, or at least not considered to be the sole inventor of Chinese characters. Cangjie was the eponym for the Cangjiepian proto-dictionary, the Cangjie method of inputting characters into a computer, and a Martian rock visited by the Mars rover Spirit, and named by the rover team.

== In traditional historiography ==
Traditional Chinese historiography treats Cangjie as a historical figure from the Three Sovereigns and Five Emperors period. Taiping Yulan states that Cangjie served as a shi 史 "historian, scribe" for the Youxiong clan that the Yellow Emperor belonged to, having received an imperial edict to create a writing system. Yiwen Leiju, quoting the Jin Chenggong Sui Gu Bi fu, states that Cangjie was a four-eyed individual who admired the way Fuxi drew out the bagua, and this inspiration invigorated him on his quest. Because he had essentially devoted his life to creating writing, Xun Kuang thus described him as a "single-minded" individual.

=== Legend of character creation ===
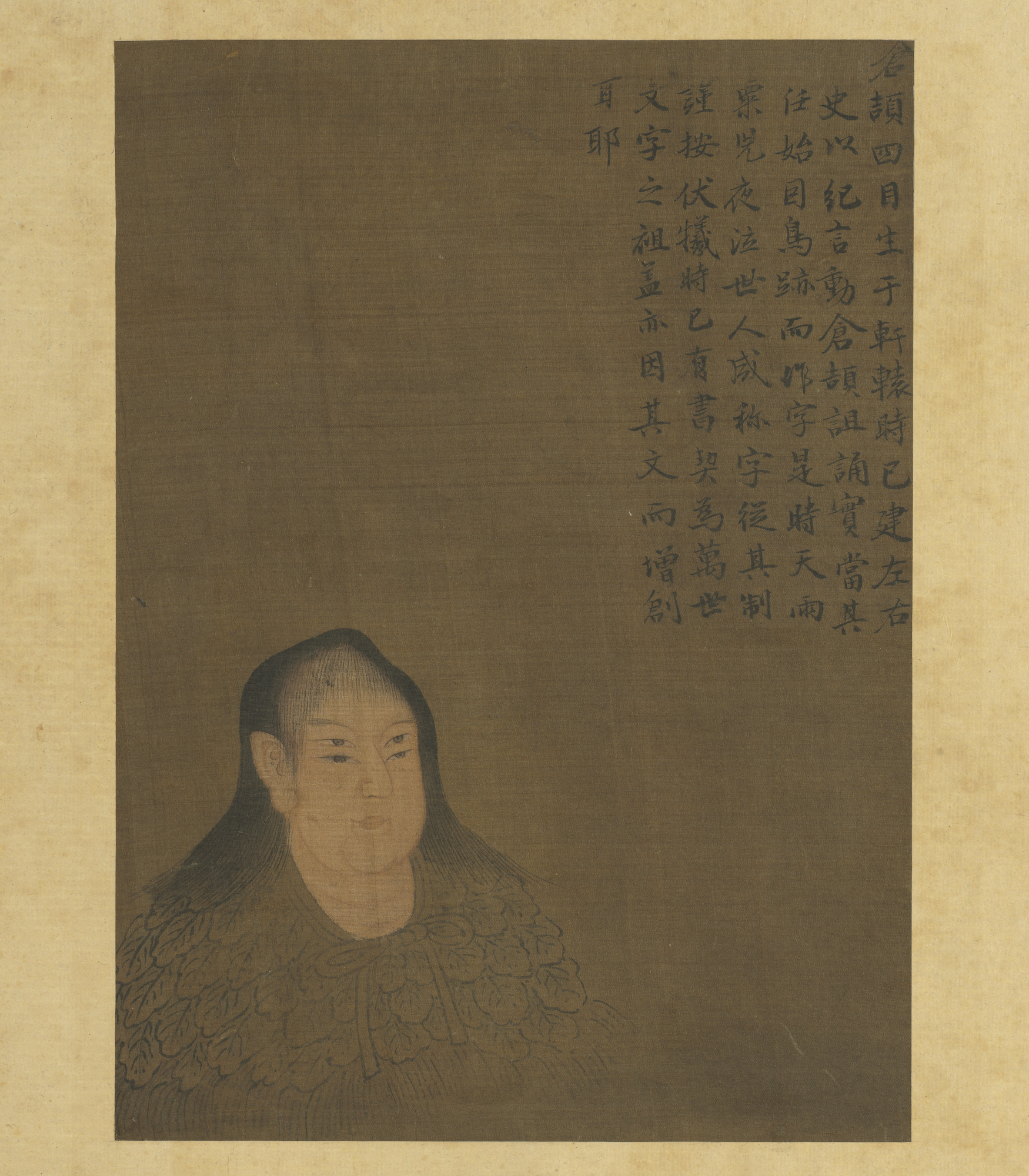
Portrait of Cangjie (National Palace Museum)

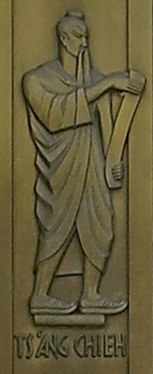
Bronze relief of Cangjie (as Ts'ang Chieh) by Lee Lawrie, 1939, at the Library of Congress's John Adams Building, Washington, D.C.

There are several versions of the legend, recorded in texts such as Xu Gan's Zhong Lun (中論) and Wang Chong's Lunheng, texts from the Eastern Han period. The preface to Xu Shen's Shuowen Jiezi also names Cangjie as the creator of characters. Xu states that the original characters were called wen 文, then became zi 字 when phonetic elements were added. Cangjie's system would vary over time, with 72 dynasties using unique offshoots.

One legend tells that shortly after unifying China, the Yellow Emperor, being dissatisfied with the "rope knot tying" method of recording information, charged Cangjie with the task of creating characters for writing. Cangjie then settled down on the bank of a river, and devoted himself to the completion of the task at hand. Even after devoting much time and effort, however, he was unable to create even one character. One day, Cangjie suddenly saw a phoenix flying in the sky above, carrying an object in its beak. The object fell to the ground directly in front of Cangjie, and he saw it to be an impression of a hoof-print. Not being able to recognize which animal the print belonged to, he asked for the help of a local hunter passing by on the road. The hunter told him that this was, without a doubt, the hoof print of a Pixiu, being different from the hoof-print of any other beast that was alive.

His conversation with the hunter greatly inspired Cangjie, leading him to believe that if he could capture in a drawing the special characteristics that set apart each and every thing on the earth, this would truly be the perfect kind of character for writing. From that day forward, Cangjie paid close attention to the characteristics of all things, including the sun, moon, stars, clouds, lakes, rivers, oceans, as well as all manner of bird and beast. He began to create characters according to the special characteristics he found, and before long, had compiled a long list of characters for writing.

To the delight of the Yellow Emperor, Cangjie presented him with the complete set of characters. The emperor then called the premiers of each of the nine provinces together in order for Cangjie to teach them this new writing system. Monuments and temples were erected in Cangjie's honor on the bank of the river where he created these characters.

Another version of the legend tells that Cangjie was inspired by observing the network of veins on a turtle. This version is particularly interesting relative to archaeology because turtle shells are one of the most common media on which the earliest known Chinese inscriptions are found, including the Jiahu symbols.

== Remains and commemorations ==
Lunheng records an ancient superstition where, because Cangjie had died on a 丙 bǐng day, scribes would refuse to write on future bǐng days. Bǐng days themselves are those ending in 3 based on the 60-day Ganzhi cycle.

There are tombs dedicated to Cangjie in the provinces of Shandong, Henan, Hebei, and Shaanxi. His descendants are said to bear the surname Shǐ (史), in recognition of his service as official historiographer.

In Taiwan, Cangjie is often enshrined as a deity in special pagodas dedicated to the burning of papers with written character, known as Xi Zi Pagoda (惜字塔).

The art piece A Book from the Sky was partially made by Xu Bing to "expose Cang Jie's crimes", containing numerous possible yet meaningless Han characters.

== See also ==
- Neolithic signs in China
- Oracle bone script
- Cangjie input method
