= Silent Energy: New Art from China =

Silent Energy: New Art from China was an exhibition of contemporary Chinese art at The Museum of Modern Art in Oxford, England, from 27 June to 24 October 1993. It was organised by The Museum of Modern Art, Oxford, and curated by David Elliott and Lydie Mepham. It resulted from the museum's policy of showing the unknown or neglected art histories of non-Western countries, and followed another exhibition that the museum held earlier on with a similar project Reconstruction: Avant-Garde Art in Japan 1945-1965.

This two-part exhibition showcased specially commissioned artworks by eight Chinese artists, seven of whom were living outside of the People's Republic in 1993. The artists shown were considered to have made important contributions to the development of the Chinese avant-garde and the ‘redefinition of the identity of Chinese contemporary art’ in the context of increasing globalism. Most are still considered major names today.

== Participating artists and works ==
Participating artists included Cai Guoqiang, Chen Zhen, Gu Wenda, Guan Wei, Huang Yongping, Wang Luyan, Xi Jianjun and Yang Jiechang. The works included painting, wall drawing and a range of installation. Hou Hanru identified ‘Subversion’, ‘Transcendence of the body’ and ‘The deconstruction of the self and the Other’ as three main themes that unified the artworks in the show.

== Exhibition review ==
Silent Energy received one review. Writing for Third Text, Tim Martin starts by explaining that Silent Energy ‘marks the first major showing in Britain of recent art from mainland China’. In his review, Tim explains that the first part of the show focusses on representational painting and sculpture, inspired by both Western art and Chinese traditional religion (Taoism or Daoism).
