= The VelociPastor =

2017 American comedy horror film by Brendan Steere

- Film poster
- Directed by: Brendan Steere
- Written by: Brendan Steere
- Produced by: Brandon Taylor; Gregory James Cohan; Jesse Gouldsbury; Brendan Steere
- Starring: Gregory James Cohan; Alyssa Kempinski; Daniel Steere; Ethan Ward; Aurelio Voltaire; Yang Jiechang; Jesse Turits
- Cinematography: Jesse Gouldsbury
- Edited by: Brendan Steere
- Music by: Ali Helnwein; Daniel McCormick
- Production companies: Hollow Tree Films; Laika Come Home
- Distributed by: Wild Eye Releasing
- Release dates: November 2, 2017 (Portland); August 13, 2019 (United States)
- Running time: 75 minutes
- Country: United States
- Language: English
- Budget: $36,000

The VelociPastor is a 2017 American comedy horror film written, directed, and edited by Brendan Steere. The plot follows pastor Doug Jones who becomes infected by an artifact, resulting in him turning into a velociraptor when he becomes angry. After screening at the B-Movie, Underground, and Trash (BUT) Film Festival on August 31, 2018, the film received a wide release in the United States on August 13, 2019, by Wild Eye Releasing.

== Plot ==
Roman-Catholic priest Doug Jones witnesses his parents die in a VFX car fire. He drives to China on a spiritual journey and comes across ninjas searching for an artifact said to turn people into the "Dragon Warrior". After becoming infected by the artifact, Doug begins having nightmares and he gets a kiss from his mentor Father Stewart. Doug then goes out into the forest late at night as he transforms into a dinosaur. He saves Carol, a prostitute, from a thug.

Waking up in Carol's bed naked, with no memory of the night before, Doug initially believes they had sex, but after Carol tells him what happened he realizes the truth. Unpersuaded by her suggestion to use his new power to fight crime and get rid of people they believe are beyond spiritual salvation, he returns to the church for confession; speaking to Frankie Mermaid, Carol's pimp, he learns Frankie is the one responsible for killing Doug's parents.

Enraged, Doug proceeds to kill Frankie and, now convinced about her plan to fight crime, returns to Carol needing her assistance. Father Stewart, learning of Doug's new power, encourages Doug to lose it and stop killing. He takes him to see Altair, an exorcist, hoping to remove Doug's power. In a flashback, it is revealed that Father Stewart saw a war buddy shot while off guard and that his love interest was killed by a mine. In the present, the exorcism fails and Doug transforms, slashing one of Father Stewart's eyes.

Returning to Carol, Doug is confronted by ninjas. Father Stewart wakes up in a camp of drug-dealing Christian ninjas led by Wei Chan, who plans to sell highly addictive cocaine to people and then cut off supplies. Wei Chan hopes this will lead the addicts to turn to the church, where he will eventually take over, and use them as his army. Father Stewart rejects this idea, and is killed. Doug and Carol are confronted by ninjas, and plan to stop Wei Chan.

Doug is stopped by Sam, the White Ninja, who he later realizes is his brother. Doug catches Sam off guard and uses telekinesis to take Sam's sword and kill him. Doug and Carol fight off more ninjas, and the latter is badly wounded. Doug, transforming into a velociraptor and fighting off the remaining ninjas, is shot by Wei Chan with an arrow containing venom to stop his transformation. Doug's hands are immune to the venom, and he proceeds to kill Wei Chan using his dinosaur powers, among other techniques. Doug carries Carol to the hospital where she recovers.

Doug, no longer a priest and with a billion-dollar bounty on his head, plans to travel the world with Carol, and continue their original plan to kill off criminals.

== Cast ==
- Gregory James Cohan as Doug Jones
- Alyssa Kempinski as Carol
- Daniel Steere as Father Stewart
- Aurelio Voltaire as Altair
- Yang Jiechang as Wei Chan
- Jesse Turits as Sam the White Ninja
- Fernando Pacheco de Castro as Frankie Mermaid
- David Sokol as War Buddy Ali
- Kathleen Steere as Adeline
- Claire Hsu as a Chinese Villager
- Nicholas M. Garofolo as Hobo
- George Schewnzer as Doug's Dad
- Zachary Steere as Dinosaur Suit Performer
- Erik Oh as Choi-Min
- Douglas Saint James as Surgeon
- Alec Lambert as Thug 1
- Ethan Ward as Thug 2
- Janice Young as Doug's Mom
- Pat Hroncich as Vietnam Soldier 1
- Dan Rhoades as Vietnam Soldier 2
- Kurt Voltmann as Goliath

== Production ==
Brendan Steere came up with the idea in 2010 while he was attending the School of Visual Arts in Manhattan, after his phone autocorrected "Velociraptor" to "Veloci Pastor". As a class project, Steere made a short film of fake exploitation trailers which included The VelociPastor. His prior YouTube videos had around 45 views each, but the class project received around 45,000 views, resulting in the feature film idea. Steere stated, "The movie is made to be fun, and anybody looking for deeper meaning in the man-turns-into-a-dinosaur genre is probably on a fool's errand."

From 2011 to 2016, two attempts to crowdfund were made, first through Kickstarter and then through Seed&Spark. The film received funding from a private investor that the mother of Steere's friend knew.

Filmed on a budget of $36,000, Steere was influenced by director Guillermo del Toro.

== Release ==
The VelociPastor premiered in Portland, Oregon on November 2, 2017. After being shown at various film festivals, the crew signed with sales agency Cyfuno Ventures who then brokered a deal with Wild Eye Releasing in 2018.

=== Home media ===
The film was released on region 1 DVD and streamed on August 13, 2019. The film is also available on Amazon Prime, Tubi, Sling, Apple TV, Peacock, Freevee, Plex, YouTube and Roku. A Blu-ray was released on September 17, 2019.

== Reception ==
On Rotten Tomatoes the film has an approval rating of 59% based on reviews from 17 critics, with an average rating of 5.5/10.

Alex McLevy, writing for The A.V. Club, said: "This movie is going to endure. It's got a killer hook, is fun to watch, and doesn't overstay its welcome. It has 'cult classic' written all over it." Michael Walsh of Nerdist said: "Is the movie good enough to be considered a truly great comedy? No, probably not. But it's still way better than most people would expect." Amanda Sink from The Hollywood Outsider said: "Albeit no cinematic achievement, The VelociPastor is a hysterically ludicrous horror-comedy that knows its absurdity and has no qualms inviting you in." Jeffrey Lyles of Lyles' Movie Files reports: "It's either the most absurd and ridiculous premise for a movie or the movie you've been waiting all of 2019 to see." Bobby LePire, for Film Threat, wrote: "Brendan Steere, his delightful cast, and committed crew have crafted a bonkers film that never stops entertaining."

== Sequel ==
Steere has stated that he wants to do a sequel, as he believes that the world of VelociPastor is "so permissible and fun". In March 2020, Steere shared a sneak peek of the script on Twitter, making the announcement that the script was completed and was set to start filming.

Production on The VelociPastor 2 wrapped on October 4, 2023, one year after a completed Kickstarter in which the team raised $118k. Unlike the first film, the sequel is directed by Jesse Gouldsbury, the cinematographer and producer of the previous film. The screenplay is written by Brendan Steere and Gouldsbury, with Steere editing the film. Alyssa Kempinski (Carol in the films) also joined as a producer.

The trailer for The VelociPastor 2 was released on October 15, 2025 after the movie premiered the previous weekend at New York Comic Con. The film was expected to release in theaters in 2025, but as of July 2026 a release date has yet to be announced.

== See also ==
- List of films featuring dinosaurs
