= Xi Zi Pagoda =

Incinerator for burning paper with written characters

The Xi Zi Pagoda (惜字塔, Xizi Ta) is a paper burning incinerator constructed in the shape of a small pagoda. In Taiwan, it is commonly referred to as Sheng Ji Ting (圣迹亭) or Xi Zi Ting (惜字亭), in Hakka regions as Jing Zi Ting (敬字亭), and in Ryukyu as Funjirū (Ryukyu language: 焚字炉(フンジルー)). Unlike incinerators used for burning joss paper for ancestral worship, the Xi Zi Pagoda is specifically designed for burning paper containing written characters. This practice reflects the deep respect and reverence ancient scholars and literati held for written characters. The pagoda also symbolizes reverence for the inventor of Chinese characters and the God of Culture and Literature.

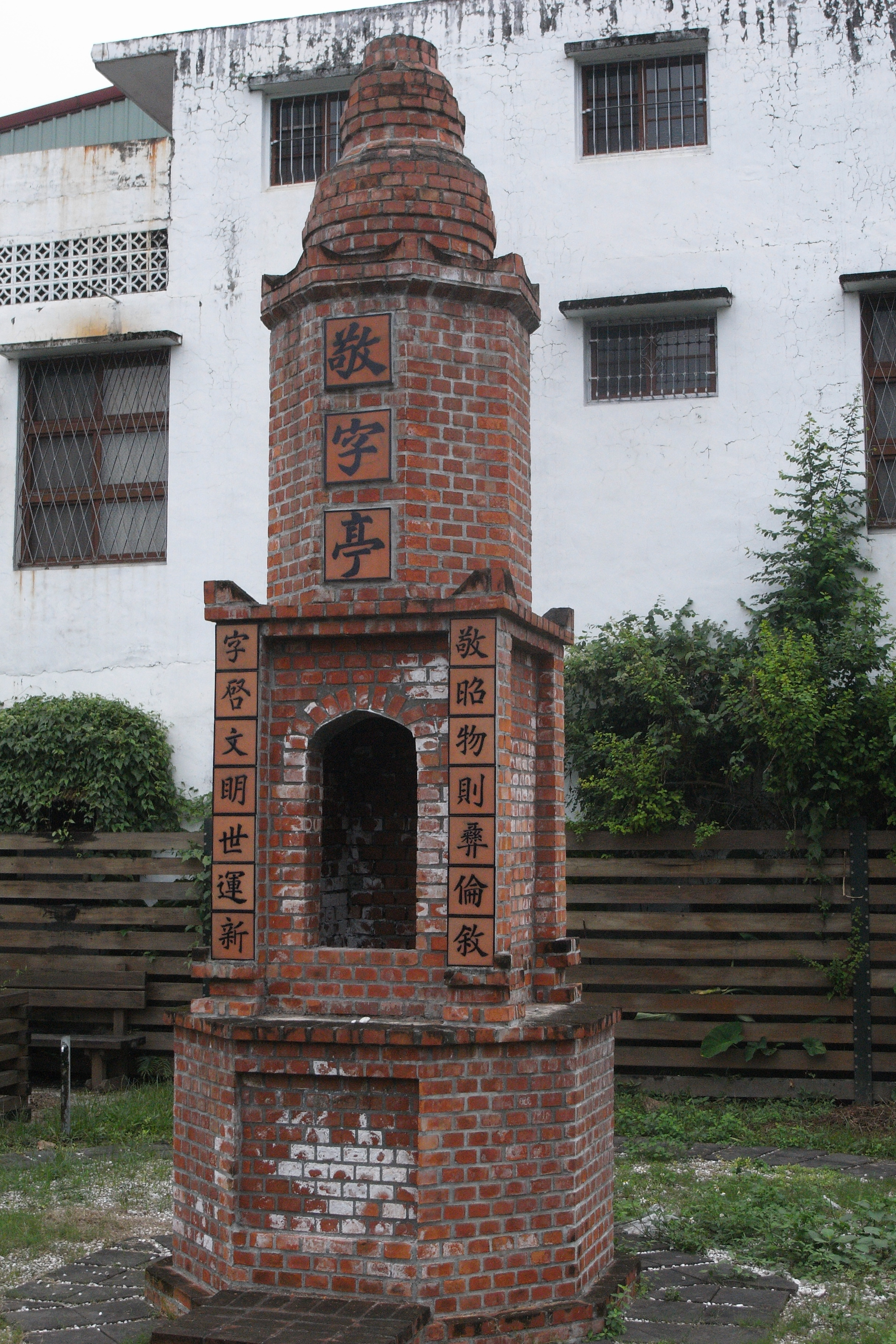
Xi Zi Pagoda of the "Jing Zi Ting" type in Taiwan, Hualian County

The belief that written characters were sacred, influenced by the imperial examination system, was deeply ingrained in ancient Chinese culture. It was considered improper to casually dispose of paper inscribed with characters. Instead, discarded paper with words had to be burned with sincere reverence. The opening poem of Volume 1 of a Ming dynasty fiction book Er Ke Pai An (二刻拍案惊奇) states: "Written characters are no different than sutras, and should be consigned to fire by those who see them, or disposed into a clean, flowing stream. Doing so will ensure endless blessings and prosperity."

According to historical records, the Xi Zi Pagoda was first constructed during the Song dynasty and became increasingly common through the Yuan, Ming, and Qing dynasties. These pagodas were typically erected at the entrances of towns, within academies and temples, and beside roads and bridges. Some wealthy families also built Xi Zi Pagodas in their courtyards. Certain pagodas featured shrines dedicated to Cang Jie, Wenchang, and Confucius, and were often adorned with corresponding couplets and auspicious patterns.
