= Qiu Zhijie =

Chinese artist

- Born: 1969 (age 56–57); Fujian province, China
- Education: Zhejiang Academy of Fine Arts, Hangzhou
- Known for: Calligraphy, Video, Photography, Painting
- Notable work: Propagator in the Darkness, Orchid Pavilion Preface, Tattoo 1, A Suicidology of the Nanjing Yangtze River Bridge

Qiu Zhijie
- Chinese: 邱志杰
Transcriptions
Standard Mandarin
- Hanyu Pinyin: Qiū Zhìjié
- IPA: [tɕʰjóʊ ʈʂɨ̂tɕjě]

Qiu Zhijie (邱志杰; born 1969) is a contemporary Chinese artist who works primarily in video and photography. Overall, Qiu's work suggests the struggle between the forces of destiny and self-assertion. Other common themes are social fragmentation and transience.

Qiu was born in 1969 in Fujian province. In 1992, he graduated from the printmaking department at Zhejiang Academy of Fine Arts, Hangzhou. He now lives and works in Beijing.

The artist's break-through exhibition was in 1992 with China's New Art, Post-1989 at the Hanart Gallery and Hong Kong Arts Centre. By 1999, his work began receiving overseas interest with his inclusion in Revolutionary Capitals: Beijing-London at the Institute of Contemporary Arts, London. In 2007 he had his first solo exhibition in the United States at the New York gallery Chambers Fine Art.

In 2005, his work was exhibited in the Victoria and Albert Museum's Between Past And Future: New Photography And Video From China, including Tattoo 1, which explores Qiu's assertion that in our media-saturated age, "signs and codes have overpowered actual human beings, and our bodies have become merely their vehicles." The character bu — meaning "no" — is written across the artist's body and on the wall behind him, creating the illusion that it floats free of the body.

== Life and work ==
Tattoo Series No. 3, No. 6, and No. 5 (1997) at the Hirshhorn Museum and Sculpture Garden in 2022

Qiu was born in 1969 in Fujian province, China. He graduated from the printmaking department of the Zhejiang Academy of Fine Arts, Hangzhou in 1992. Soon after, he was developing his technical and conceptual skills, as seen in his graduate work A New Life (1992). The installation featured 16 glass panels of different sizes on which texts, slogans, and figures were printed. The installation create a translucent labyrinth from these panels, which allowed the audience to take part in the work as their bodies filled the clear sections of the glass panels. Qiu's work in A New Life developed the basis for later works including Bathroom (1997) and his Tattoo series (1994). The Tattoo series in particular further explored the concept of free-floating symbols and words that were imposed on the individual. The imposition of the external world onto the individual for better or worse is also featured in his Rainbow photography series.

Beyond symbols, icons, and external pressures, Qiu has explored the concept of transience in many of his works. His Baguo series of photographs, for instance, displays scenes of streets with market stalls and buildings, but the streets are filled with ghostly half-transparent roaming figures. These "ghosts" imply a sense that they are coming and going but never stationary enough to make a lasting impression, as the buildings have. His Propagator in the Darkness lithograph also presents this theme. The lithograph displays a skeleton shouting through a megaphone inside a bell. Regarding this work, Qiu has said "No one can see him or hear him, but he's still showing his propaganda slogan. For me this is about sounds disappearing, about the past disappearing. Whether it's good or not, we don't know. It's quite a complicated feeling." According to Qiu in an interview from 2001, the most significant turning point in his career was his work producing the installation Public Life/Glass Toilet (1994), which led to an ongoing interest in revealing the otherwise obscured practices of art production.

Qiu is an accomplished author of Art theory books. his published books include as “Image and Post-modernism”, “Give Me A Mask”, “The Boundary of Freedom”, “The Scene is Most Important”, “Photography After Photography”, and “Basic Course in Total Art Creation”.

Qiu is currently a professor at the School of Inter-media Art of China Art Academy, the Director of Total Art Studio and member of the supervisor team in the Art and Social Thoughts Institute. He also curated "Phenomena and Image" in 1996, a series of exhibitions with the theme of “Post-sense Sensibility” between 1999 and 2004, “Long March, A Walking Visual Display” in 2002, and the video portion of the First Guangzhou Triennial and “Archeology of Future: The Second Triennial of Chinese Art” in 2005.

Qiu has been teaching in the Total Art Studio of China Academy of Art since 2003. He has proposed ways to develop the concept of “total art” in both formal academic and professional contexts.

== Exhibitions ==
The following is a list of solo exhibitions that Qiu has created. He has participated in many more exhibitions in groups.

- 2018 - Qiu Zhijie: Living Writing. 21st Century Museum of Contemporary Art, Kanazawa, Kanazawa, Japan
- 2011 - Qiu Zhijie: DEJA VU. Hanart TZ Gallery, Hong Kong
- 2009 - Mochou. Chambers Fine Art, New York City, United States
- 2009 - A Suicidology of The Nanjing Yangzi River Bridge 3 - Breaking through the ice. UCCA, Beijing
- 2008 - A Suicidology of The Nanjing Yangzi River Bridge 1 -Ataraxic of Zhuang Zi. Shanghai Zendai Museum of Modern Art, Shanghai
- 2008 - A Suicidology of The Nanjing Yangzi River Bridge 1. The Singapore Tyler Print Institute, Singapore
- 2008 - The Bridge, Nanjing, Under the Heaven. The Singapore Tyler Print Institute, Singapore
- 2008 - Mochou. Chambers Fine Art, Beijing
- 2008 - The Bridge, Nanjing, Under the Heaven. Hanart Gallery, Hong Kong
- 2008 - Nanjing : A bridge, A City. Guanxiang Art Center, Taipei
- 2007 - The Shape of Time. Chambers Fine Art, New York City, United States
- 2007 - Cryptogram. Hanart Gallery, Hong Kong
- 2007 - Archeology of Memory. Long March Space, Beijing
- 2006 - Let there be Light. Grace Li Gallery, Zürich, Switzerland
- 2005 - Light and Words. Hanart TZ Gallery, Hong Kong
- 2005 - Melancholy Man. Gallery Loft, Paris, France
- 2005 - Black and White Zoo. Gallery of Dartington Art Academy, United Kingdom
- 2004 - Social Portrait. Courtyard Gallery, Beijing, China
- 2003-2004 - Asian Parallel Times. Hong Kong Art Museum, Hong Kong, Casa Asia, Barcelona, Spain, & Shenzhen Art Institute, Shenzhen, China
- 2003 - UFO: Qiu Zhijie's Photography/Calligraphy. Gallery Loft, Paris, France
- 2001 - Qiu Zhijie. Gallery Gen, Koshigaya, Japan
- 2001 - Invisibility: Qiu Zhijie. Ethan Cohen Fine Arts, New York City, United States
- 2000 - Touch. Orient Foundation, Macau
- 1999 - Calendar 1998. Gallery of the Central Academy of Fine Arts, Beijing, China
- 1999 - Innate Forces – Mixed Media: Works by Qiu Zhijie. Art Beatus Gallery, Vancouver, Canada
- 1997 - Logic: 5 Video-Installations. Gallery of the Central Academy of Fine Arts, Beijing, China

== See also ==
- Chinese art
- Yang Fudong
- Feng Mengbo
- Huang Yong Ping
- Shen Qibin
