= Jerome A. Cohen =

American legal academic (1930–2025)

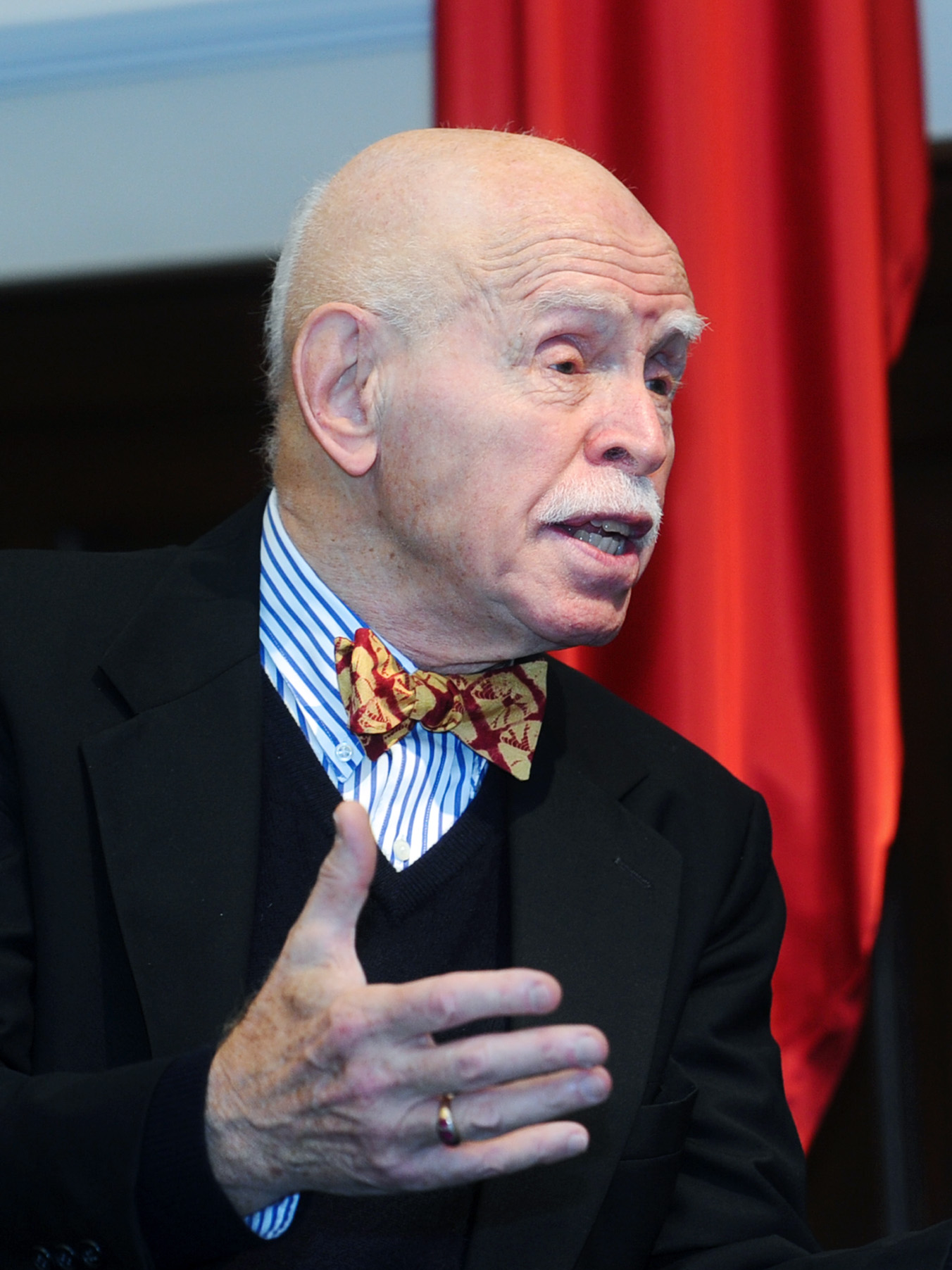
- Cohen in 2011
- Born: July 1, 1930; Elizabeth, New Jersey, U.S.
- Died: September 22, 2025 (aged 95); New York City, U.S.
- Education: Yale University (BA, JD)
- Occupation: Law professor
- Spouse: Joan Lebold (m. 1954)
- Children: 3, including Ethan

Chinese name
- Traditional Chinese: 孔傑榮
- Simplified Chinese: 孔杰荣
Transcriptions
Standard Mandarin
- Hanyu Pinyin: Kǒng Jiéróng

Chinese name
- Chinese: 柯恩
Transcriptions
Standard Mandarin
- Hanyu Pinyin: Kē Ēn

Jerome Alan Cohen (July 1, 1930 – September 22, 2025) was an American sinologist and legal scholar. He was a professor of law at the New York University School of Law, an expert in Chinese law, and an adjunct senior fellow for Asia Studies at the Council on Foreign Relations.

Cohen was an advocate of human rights in China, and took active roles in securing the release of Song Yongyi and Chen Guangcheng from under Chinese custody. His former students include Taiwanese president Ma Ying-jeou, and former Taiwanese vice president Annette Lu.

== Early life and education ==
Cohen was born in Elizabeth, New Jersey, and spent his early years in Linden, New Jersey, the son of a local government attorney. After graduating from Linden High School, Cohen received his B.A. degree from Yale University, where he graduated in 1951 with high honors and high orations and was a member of Phi Beta Kappa. Following graduation, he spent a year in France as a Fulbright scholar studying international relations before returning to Yale and earning his J.D. from Yale Law School in 1955. While at Yale Law, he served as the editor-in-chief of the Yale Law Journal. From 1955–56 he clerked at the Supreme Court, first under Chief Justice Earl Warren and then under Justice Felix Frankfurter.

== Career in China ==
Cohen joined the faculty of University of California, Berkeley School of Law in 1959. It was here that he was asked to find a candidate for a four-year grant to study China offered by the Rockefeller Foundation, and, when no clear candidate emerged, decided to pursue the opportunity himself. He began studying the Chinese language, but as Americans were not permitted to enter China at the time, he could only travel as far as Hong Kong, where he met with refugees and questioned them on Chinese criminal procedure. These interviews served as the basis for his book, "The Criminal Process of the People's Republic of China: 1949–1963."

In 1964, Cohen became a professor at Harvard Law School, where he would remain for 17 years, and created the school's East Asia Legal Studies Association. During this time, Cohen advocated for normalized relations with China, and was influential in securing the release of John T. Downey in the early 1970s. Downey, a former classmate of Cohen's from Yale, had been held in a Chinese prison since the Korean War, accused of being a CIA operative. In 1972, Cohen was able to make his first trip to the mainland China as part of a delegation of the Federation of American Scientists and was able to meet with Premier Zhou Enlai. In 1977, he accompanied Senator Ted Kennedy to Beijing where they met with Deng Xiaoping.

Following China's economic reforms in 1979, Cohen's obscure specialty of Chinese law was thrust into the spotlight as foreign companies began to consider investment opportunities. When he was offered the opportunity to live and practice in Beijing in exchange for teaching American contract law to commerce officials, Cohen took a sabbatical from Harvard. When the sabbatical concluded in 1981, he decided to remain in China and work at the law firm of Paul, Weiss, Rifkind, Wharton & Garrison.

Following the suppression of student uprising in Tiananmen Square in 1989, Paul Weiss closed its Hong Kong Office, and Cohen returned to the United States where he became a Professor of Law at New York University School of Law in 1990. He concurrently serves as Of Counsel for Paul, Weiss, Rifkind, Wharton & Garrison. At NYU, he established the U.S.-Asia Law Institute, dedicated to facilitating the development of the rule of law throughout Asia.

== Human rights work ==
Cohen was instrumental in advocating for the release of political prisoners, including Song Yongyi, a librarian at Dickinson College who was charged in China for selling intelligence overseas after he mailed newspapers, books, and Red Guard posters to the U.S.

Cohen assisted and advised Chinese civil rights activist Chen Guangcheng, after Chen escaped from house arrest in 2012. After a series of negotiations between the U.S. and Chinese governments, Chen was allowed to travel to the U.S. and become a fellow at New York University.

Cohen also served on the Board of Directors for the U.S. Committee for Human Rights in North Korea.

== Taiwan ==
Cohen's influence was particularly strong in Taiwan where his former student, Ma Ying-jeou (馬英九) was president from 2008 to 2016.

In 1985, Cohen played a key role in securing the release of political prisoner Annette Lu (呂秀蓮) who had been a student of Cohen's at Harvard and who would later become vice-president of Taiwan. Cohen asked his former student Ma Yingjeou who was now secretary to the Republic of China's President Chiang Ching-kuo to intervene. Lu had been sentenced to 12 years in prison for her role in the Kaohsiung Incident. A week after Cohen arrived in Taiwan, Lu was freed.

Also in 1985, following the murder in California of Henry Liu, a Taiwanese-American author critical of the martial law government, Cohen served as a pro-bono representative of Liu's widow at the trial in Taipei. On appeal of what he thought was a show trial convicting reputed gangsters, he sought to show that the government was directly involved in the plot. The sentences were upheld, and later, Taiwan's chief of military intelligence was also convicted for his involvement.

== Korea ==
In 1972, Cohen became the first American academic to visit North Korea.

In South Korea, Cohen was able to intervene in the kidnapping of Kim Dae-jung (김대중), who would later become president and receive the Nobel Peace Prize. In August, 1973, Cohen received an urgent call from Kim's aide, telling him that Kim had been kidnapped by Korean intelligence officials in Tokyo and imploring Cohen to request Henry Kissinger's help. Cohen did and Kim's life was saved, although Kim later reported that he had been bound and blindfolded aboard a boat with weights tied to his wrists, before the execution was suddenly called off.

== Death ==
Cohen died on September 22, 2025, at his home in Manhattan, New York, at the age of 95.

== Works ==
Cohen's writings regularly appeared in Hong Kong's English daily South China Morning Post.

- "The Struggle for Autonomy of Beijing's Public Interest Lawyers," China Rights Forum, 2009, no. 1.
- Investment Law and Practice in Vietnam (Longman, 1990)
- Contract Law of the People's Republic of China (Longman, 1988) (with Yvonne Y.F. Chan and Ho Yuk Ming)
- People's China and International Law (Princeton University Press, 1974) (with H.D. Chiu)
- The Criminal Process in the People's Republic of China, 1949–63: An Introduction (Harvard University Press, 1968)
- Eastward, Westward: A Life in Law (Columbia University Press, 2025)

== See also ==
- List of law clerks for the chief justice of the United States
- List of law clerks for the second seat of the Supreme Court of the United States
- William P. Alford, Harvard Law School scholar of Chinese law
- Chinese law
