= The Enduring Passion for Ink =

- Directed by: Britta Erickson
- Produced by: Britta Erickson
- Cinematography: Richard Widmer
- Edited by: Richard Widmer
- Release date: 2013
- Running time: 10 shorts, 12 minutes each
- Country: United States
- Language: English

The Enduring Passion for Ink: Films on Contemporary Ink Painters is a 2013 documentary film independently produced by scholar-curator Britta Erickson. The film features 10 contemporary Chinese ink artists at the vanguard of the contemporary Chinese art world today.

The documentary opens the door to what contemporary Chinese ink painting is to a wider audience and addresses fundamental choices confronting these leading ink artists.

== Artists featured ==
The 10 artists featured span a wide range of ages, education backgrounds, artistic approaches, and philosophies. They are:

1. Bingyi
2. Chen Haiyan
3. Cui Zhenkuan
4. Li Huasheng
5. Li Jin
6. Liu Dan
7. Wang Dongling
8. Xu Bing
9. Yang Jiechang
10. Zheng Chong bin

The film follows the scholar/curator of this project into the studios of these artists where the viewer can watch as these artist's work unfold.

The artists share in the intimacy of their studio their experience and views on ink as a medium versus other art forms, their creative expression, and the boundaries and innovation of ink art in relation to the traditional with scholar-curator Britta Erickson.

== Development ==
The film is solely produced, directed, curated by scholar-curator Britta Erickson who wished to create a project of her own at the time when she turned 50.

US-born Richard Widmer shot and edited the documentary.
