= Yang Jiechang =

Chinese contemporary artist (born 1956)

Yang Jiechang (Chinese: 杨诘苍; born 1956 in Foshan, Guangdong Province) is a contemporary artist of Chinese origin whose work combines traditional Chinese painting and calligraphy with contemporary art practices.

== Life and education ==
Yang Jiechang was born in 1956 in Foshan in Guangdong Province, PR China. He grew up during the Cultural Revolution (1966–1976) and received an early training in traditional Chinese culture from his grandfather, who taught him calligraphy and the use of the Chinese brush. From 1973 to 1978, Yang apprenticed at the Foshan Folk Art Institute, studying calligraphy, ink painting, paper mounting, and meticulous colour painting. He studied Chinese painting at the Guangzhou Academy of Fine Arts from 1978 to 1982, where he taught until 1988 and subsequently taught there until 1988. Yang Jiechang belongs to the first generation of artists educated after the Cultural Revolution - universities and art academies reopened in late 1977 - , and his early career developed alongside China's cultural opening in the late 1970s and 1980s. In 1988, French curator Jean-Hubert Martin, at the time director of the Centre Georges Pompidou in Paris, invited him to take part in the exhibition "Magiciens de la terre", held in the Centre Pompidou in 1989. Yang has since lived and worked in Europe.

== Work ==
Yang Jiechang works in painting, calligraphy, installation, video, photography, and performance. He is best known for his use of traditional Chinese media—particularly ink painting, meticulous color painting, and calligraphy—recontextualised within contemporary art.

Yang achieved international recognition with Hundred Layers of Ink (1989–1999), a series of large-scale monochrome ink paintings first shown in Magiciens de la terre. Created by applying successive layers of pure and diluted ink onto Xuan paper, the works emphasize the material qualities of ink, water, and paper. The paintings feature abstract forms in which distinctions between figure and ground are minimised, and the series has been interpreted as emphasizing process and contemplation over representation. Influences and conceptual approach

Following his move to Europe, Yang engaged with Romanticism, particularly German Romanticism, alongside concepts drawn from Daoist philosophy. These influences inform works such as Hundred Layers of Ink (1989-1999), Scroll of Secret Merit (2004), and Double View – Crosses (2014), which explore material immediacy, spirituality, and self-transformation.

Since the early 2000s, Yang's work has increasingly focused on figurative painting. He frequently employs the meticulous colour technique on silk, using vegetal and mineral pigments. This technique is historically associated with the Lingnan School of painting of the early 20th century. Works from this period include Crying Landscape (2003), Tomorrow Cloudy Sky (2005), Stranger than Paradise (2009–2016), Tale of the Eleventh Day (2011–2022), and a series of self-portraits.

Calligraphy is a central component of Yang's practice. In addition to Chinese characters, he uses Western languages, often incorporating deliberate errors and irregularities. Works in this vein include Testament (1991), I Still Remember (1999–2019), Oh My God / Oh Diu (2002–2005), and Dark Writing (2019).

Oh My God / Oh Diu consists of a calligraphic diptych accompanied by video recordings of the artist writing and vocalizing the phrases "Oh my God" and the Cantonese expletive "Oh, diu." The work that was produced in response to the September 11 attacks, sImilar to many of his figurative works, reflect the artists engagement with current events.

== Exhibitions ==
Yang has participated in numerous exhibitions, including:

- China Avant-Garde, National Art Museum of China, Beijing, 1989
- Les Magiciens de la terre, Centre Pompidou, Paris, 1989
- Chine demain pour hier, Pourrières, France, 1990
- Silent Energy, Modern Art Oxford, 1993
- Shenzhen International Ink Biennial, Shenzhen, PR China, 1998, 2000, 2002
- Pause Gwangju Biennale, Korea, 2002
- Zone of Urgency, Venice Biennale, Venice, 2003
- La Nuit Blanche, Paris, France, 2004
- Le moine et le démon, Musée d'art contemporain de Lyon, Lyon, France, 2004
- All Under Heaven, Muhka, Antwerp, Belgium, 2004
- Beyond, Second Guangzhou Triennial, Guanzhou, PR China, 2005
- Layered Landscapes, Stanford Art Gallery, Stanford, USA, 2005
- Biennial of Emergency, Palais de Tokyo, Paris, 2005
- Liverpool Biennial, Liverpool, UK, 2006
- Laboratoires pour un avenir incertain, La Force de l'Art - 1st Paris Triennial, Grand Palais, Paris, 2006
- Capolavoro, Palazzo di Primavera, Terni, Rome, 2006
- Istanbul Biennial, Istanbul, 2007
- Metamorphosis - The Generation of Transformation in Chinese Contemporary Art, Tampere Art Museum, Tampere, Finland, 2007
- New Wave '85 UCCA, Beijing, PR China, 2007
- Onda Anomala – Manifesta 7, Trento, Italy, 2008
- Against Exclusion, Third Moscow Biennale of Contemporary Art, Garage, Moscow, 2009
- Lyon Biennial, Museum of Modern and Contemporary Art, Lyon, France, 2009
- Qui a peur des artistes ? Une sélection d’œuvres de la Fondation François Pinault, Musée de Dinard, France, 2009
- Hareng Saur : Ensor et l'art contemporain, MSK and S.M.A.K., Ghent, Belgium, 2010
- Le Jardin Emprunté, Jardin du Palais-Royal, Paris, 2010
- The World Belongs to You, Palazzo Grassi, Fondation F. Pinault, Venice, 2011
- Death Matters, Tropenmuseum, Amsterdam, Netherlands, 2011
- Reactivation, Shanghai Biennale, Shanghai, PR China, 2012
- Sehnsucht, Gaasbeek Castle, Belgium, 2012
- Clouds, Museum of Sketches for Public Art, Lund, Sweden, 2012
- Zizhiqu/ Autonomous Regions, Times Museum Guangzhou, PR China, 2013
- Ink Art: Past as Present in Contemporary China, Metropolitan Museum of Art, New York, 2013
- China's Changing Landscape, Nordic Watercolour Museum, Sweden, 2014
- La Chine ardente. Sculptures monumentales contemporaines, Mons - European Capital of Culture, Belgium, 2015
- Harmony and Transition. Chinese Landscapes in Contemporary Art, MARTa Herford, Herford, Germany, 2015
- Fragmentary Narratives, Stanford Art Gallery, Stanford, USA, 2016
- Carambolages, Grand Palais, Paris, 2016
- Art and China After 1989: Theatre of the World, Guggenheim Museum, New York, 2017/2018.
- Carte Blanche à Yang Jiechang, Musée Guimet, Paris, 2022
- Shifting Surfaces, Bernhard Knaus Fine Art, Frankfurt, 2024
- Yang Jiechang: Artists Continue to Try Hard, Guangdong Museum of Art, Guangzhou, PRCh, 2025

== Filmography ==
- 2013 - The Enduring Passion for Ink
- 2017 - The VelociPastor
- 2022 - Carte Blanche à Yang Jiechang

== Collections ==
Yang Jiechang's work is held in the following permanent collections:

- Brooklyn Museum, New York City
- Metropolitan Museum of Art, New York City
- Centre Georges Pompidou, Paris
- Musée Guimet, Paris
- Musée Cernuschi, Paris
- LACMA, Los Angeles
- Guangdong Museum of Art, Guangzhou
- M+, Hong Kong
