= Feng Mengbo =

Chinese artist

Feng Mengbo (冯梦波, Féng Mèngbō, born 1966) is a contemporary Chinese artist who works mainly in new media.

He graduated from Central Academy of Fine Arts, Beijing in 1992. He now lives and works in Beijing.

His interactive installation My Private Album was shown in Documenta X in 1997, and video game mod installation Q4U (produced by The Renaissance Society, based on Quake III Arena) was shown in Documenta 11 in 2002. Ah_Q is a dancing-pad version of Q4U won the Award of Distinction of Interactive Art, Prix Ars Electronica, 2004.

== Life ==
Feng Mengbo (冯梦波) was born in Beijing, 1966. In early 1970s, Chinese Cultural Revolution reached its peak and had a huge impact on Feng's childhood. In late 1970s, as Mao died, Deng took the power and China started its economic reform and open policy. Many new culture and technologies flowed into China from Western countries. Such social changes influenced Feng and his generation in a dramatic way.

In 1993, two years after graduating from the printmaking department of Beijing's Central Academy of Fine Arts at age 27, Feng was invited to exhibit his artworks in the Biennale's “Aperto” exhibition of international emerging artists. At this time period, Feng's paintings based on his memories of childhood, especially the Culture Revolution (1966–1976). He combined these elements with the aesthetic of 8-bit video games to create his early acrylic-on-canvas works, which entitled The Video Endgame Series.

During the same time period, Feng also finished a CD-ROM art named My Private Diary. This is a personal narrative that included sections of sepia-toned family photographs of Feng's family from three generations and many popular graphics from record covers, posters and advertisements in old days.

In 1997, Feng started to spend most of his time on creating computer-based artworks. In the same year, Feng finished his second CD-ROM art, Taking Mount Doom by Strategy. In this work, Feng combined a very popular opera during Chinese Culture Revolution time period with a popular shooter game at that time.

In 1999, Feng started a series of works based on the post-apocalyptic game Quake. Q3 (1999) is a 32-minute computer-generated film made by him. Feng inserted the image of himself into the film in order to realize his childhood dream- to be a hero. In 2002, Feng took a step further and created Q4U. By altering the open-source code of the game Quake III Arena, he turned all the characters in the game into his own images.

In October 2008, Feng exhibited his new work Q2008 at the annual Shanghai eArts Festival. Instead of inserting his own image into the game, Q2008 featured naked CG women armed with cell phones and shoot flowers.

In 2009, Feng finished another computer game-based work, Long March Restart (2009). This is the final work of Game Over: Long March (a series of paintings Feng created in 1993). Again, Feng used the image of Yang Zirong (his childhood hero in Taking Mount Doom by Strategy) as the main character in Long March: Restart.

== Work ==
- Long March:Restart
  Long March: Restart

Long March: Restart is a videogame Feng created based on Long March: Game Over, which is a series of oil paintings that combined the Long March (a famous Chinese military campaign, from 1934 to 1936, led by Mao Zedong) with elements from popular videogames. The paintings are more like videogame screen with digitized Red Army soldier that throws Coca-Cola cans as grenades at his enemies.

Long March: Restart continued this style and became a single player positioned video game. In 2008, this work was displayed for the first time on an 80-foot-long digital wall in MoMA PS1, New York. Viewers can take over a wireless controller and control the Red Army Soldier through 14 stages, which is familiar to Super Mario Bros.

Then what makes the work so unique? In Feng's own words :original intention in designing the installation, which lies in the continued use of the audience's, i.e. the gamers’, way of motion as the chief measuring mechanism...I wanted to enable the character to move freely along the stretched scroll. Because of the vast space of the exhibition hall and the intentionally designed pace of the character, the gamer and the audience would have to dash to catch up with the character.

- My Private Album

This is a personal narrative that included sections of sepia-toned family photographs of Feng's family from three generations and many popular graphics from record covers, posters and advertisements in old days.

- Taking Mount Doom by Strategy

In 1997, Feng started to spend most of his time on creating computer-based artworks. In the same year, Feng finished his second CD-ROM art, Taking Mount Doom by Strategy. In this work, Feng combined a very popular opera during Chinese Culture Revolution time period with a popular shooter game at that time.

- Quake Series

In 1999, Feng started a series of works based on the post-apocalyptic game Quake. Q3 (1999) is a 32-minute computer-generated film made by him. Feng inserted the image of himself into the film in order to realize his childhood dream- to be a hero. In 2002, Feng took a step further and created Q4U. By altering the open-source code of the game Quake III Arena, he turned all the characters in the game into his own images.

In October 2008, Feng exhibited his new work Q2008 at the annual Shanghai eArts Festival. Instead of inserting his own image into the game, Q2008 featured naked CG women armed with cell phones and shoot flowers

== Exhibitions of Feng Mengbo ==
Solo Exhibitions

2007

- Wrong Code: Shan Shui, Hanart T Z Gallery, Hong Kong

2006

- Built to Order, Hanart T Z Gallery, Hong Kong

2005

- Q4U, The New England Institute of Art, Boston

2004

- Q3D Feng Mengbo –Video and Oil Paintings, Hanart T Z Gallery, Hong Kong

2003

- Q4U 2003: The Two-dimensional Works, ShanghART Gallery, Shanghai
- Past Virtualized- Future Cloned: Feng Mengbo 1994–2003, MOCA Museum, Taipei

2002

- Q4U, The Renaissance Society, Chicago, USA

2001

- Feng Mengbo: Phantom Tales, Dia Center for the Arts, New York
- Paintings by Feng Mengbo, Hanart T Z Gallery, Hong Kong

1998

- Feng Mengbo: Video Games, Haggerty Museum, Milwaukee, USA
- Feng Mengbo: Holly Solomon Gallery, New York

1994

- Game Over: Long March, Hanart T Z Gallery, Hong Kong

Group Exhibitions

2016

- Chinese Whispers, Museum of Fine Arts Bern, Bern, Switzerland

1999

- Zeitwenden, Kunstmuseum Bonn, traveled to Museum Moderner Kunst Stiftung Ludwing Wien in 2000
- Asia Pacific Art Triennale/MAAP99, Brisbane, Australia
- The 1st Fukuoka Asian Art Triennale 1999, Fukuoka Asian Art Museum, Japan

1997

- 2nd Johannesburg Biennial, South Africa
- Lyon Biennial, France
- Kwangju Biennial, Kwangju
- Documenta X, Kassel

1996

- Remote Connections, Neue Galerie, Graz, Austria
- Reckoning With The Past – Contemporary Chinese Painting, the Fruitmarket Gallery, Edinburgh, Scotland

1995

- 1st Kwangju Biennial, Kwangju
- Visions of Happiness – Ten Asian Contemporary Artists, the Japan Foundation Forum, Tokyo

1993

- 45th Venice Biennial, Italy

== See also ==
- Chinese art
- Yang Fudong
- Qiu Zhijie
- Huang Yong Ping
