= Zhang Yonglian =

Chinese molecular biologist and endocrinologist

Zhang Yonglian (Chinese: 张永莲; born February 1935), also known as Yong-Lian Zhang, is a Chinese molecular biologist and endocrinologist. She is Professor and Founding Director of the Shanghai Key Laboratory for Molecular Andrology at the Shanghai Institute of Biochemistry and Cell Biology, and a member of the Chinese Academy of Sciences.

== Biography ==
Zhang was born in Shanghai in February 1935. After graduating from the Department of Chemistry of Fudan University in 1957, she joined the Shanghai Institute of Biochemistry and Cell Biology of the Chinese Academy of Sciences. For the next 20 years she worked in a highly classified national defence program researching radiation biology under director Zhang Youduan (张友端), and was virtually unknown to the outside world.

Since 1978, her research has been focused on steroid hormones. She went to London, England in 1983 and worked at the Molecular Endocrinology Lab of the Imperial Cancer Research Fund (ICRF) for two years. After returning to China, she participated in collaboration programs with multiple universities in the United States, Europe, Australia, and Hong Kong.

She is considered a pioneer in steroid hormone research, with a particular focus on the mechanisms of how androgens regulate eukaryotic transcription. She discovered that the new gene Bin1b can initiate the movement of sperm and has antimicrobial functions, the first such gene known in the epididymis. Her findings were published in the journal Science. In 2007, she founded the Shanghai Key Laboratory for Molecular Andrology to study the generation and maturation of sperm using genetic methods.

== Honours and recognition ==
Zhang was elected an academician of the Chinese Academy of Sciences (CAS) in 2001. She has won the State Natural Science Award (Second Class), the CAS Natural Science Award (First Class), and the Ho Leung Ho Lee Prize for Life Sciences.
