= Chen Haiyan =

Chinese printmaker (born 1955)

Chen Haiyan (Chinese: 陈海燕; born 1955 in Fushun, Liaoning) is a Chinese avant-garde printmaker working in etching and woodblock printing. She studied printmaking at the China Academy of Art (then named Zhejiang Academy of Fine Arts), graduating in 1984, and later became a faculty member at the school. Her work is influenced by themes of dreams and the unconscious mind, inspired by a dream diary she has kept since 1980. She has used historical Chinese woodblock techniques, including those used in Buddhist sutras.

Her artistic approach incorporates elements from Buddhism, Daoism, Western philosophy, and German expressionism. Since 1999, she has expanded her practice to include ink wash painting. She has created large-scale works. Her works are held in museum and gallery collections internationally, including in the British Museum; that institution's website states that she is "one of the best known and leading contemporary printmakers in China". In 1993, she was among the artists whose works made up China's New Art, Post-1989, the first major exhibition of Chinese experimental art outside mainland China.

She was featured in the documentary The Enduring Passion for Ink.
