= Ethan Cohen (gallerist) =

American collector and art dealer based in New York City

- Born: January 5, 1961 (age 65); California, U.S.
- Education: Harvard University (BA)
- Occupation: Gallerist
- Parents: Jerome A. Cohen (father); Joan Lebold Cohen (mother)

Ethan Cohen (born January 5, 1961) is an American collector and art dealer based in New York City who specialises in contemporary Chinese art and contemporary African art. He was one of the first western dealers to sell work by contemporary Japanese and Chinese artists including Ushio Shinohara and Ai Weiwei. He has been called "one of the most influential art dealers in the world".

== Life and career ==
He was born to Jerome A. Cohen, an expert in Chinese law and Joan Lebold Cohen, a photographer in California. Cohen's passion for Asian art was greatly influenced by his parents. They collected works by young Chinese artist at the time when no galleries were interested in representing Chinese contemporary art. Cohen studied in China in the late 1980s.

The first work Ethan Cohen purchased was made by Kong Bai Ji. His love for Chinese art grew deeper after graduating from Harvard College where he majored in East Asian Studies. He then decided to promote and curate Chinese art on his own while working as a designer at Diane Von Furstenberg. Cohen found a space on Greene St and established Art Waves Ethan Cohen Gallery in 1987. In the 1980s he became friend and patron of the young Ai Weiwei, now one of the most famous contemporary Chinese artists. He showed artwork made by artists of The Stars Group, which is the most significant avant-garde art group formed during cultural revolution.

He has visited Dafen Village in China to advise Chinese painters on how to break into the international art market.

== Ethan Cohen Fine Arts ==
Ethan Cohen Gallery was founded in 1987 as Art Waves/Ethan Cohen in SoHo, New York City. It was the first gallery to present the Chinese Avant Garde of the '80s to the United States. He has represented artists including Ai Weiwei, Xu Bing, Gu Wenda, Zhao Bandi, Wang Keping and Qiu Zhijie. Ethan Cohen Fine Arts today represents a diverse global mix of art, including contemporary American, African, Iranian, Chinese, Korean, Japanese, Russian, Pakistani and Thai, from emerging and established artists.
