= Shen Qibin =

Chinese artist and art disseminator (born 1966)

- Born: 1966 (age 59–60); Yixing, Jiangsu, China
- Known for: Museum director, contemporary Chinese artist
- Notable work: Post Garden (后花园系列); The Line of Life (生命线系列); The Growth (长草系列); + & - （+ 和-）; Tang - Dynasty Lions and Song - Dynasty Porcelain （唐狮宋瓷）; One Hundred Han Dynasty Bricks（一百块汉砖）; Exchange Plan（交换计划）; Through the Jungle of History（穿越历史的丛林）; Make the Past Serve the Present and Foreign Things Serve China（古为今用，洋为中用）; He Who Does Not Reach the Great Wall Is Not a True Man（不到长城非好汉）

Chinese name
- Chinese: 沈其斌
- Hanyu Pinyin: Shěn Qíbīn

Shen Qibin (沈其斌; born in 1966 in Yixing, Jiangsu, China) is a Chinese contemporary artist, museum director, art mentor, and disseminator of new humanistic ideas. He has multiple identities. Starting his avant-garde art creation in the 1980s, he has had a creative career spanning over 40 years to date, with his artistic expressions encompassing various media. As a veteran museum director with 25 years of experience, he has established more than 10 art platforms, curated hundreds of art exhibitions both domestically and internationally, published over 200 art albums, and delivered more than 100 lectures at home and abroad. He has been at the forefront of the art world, leading the development of Chinese contemporary art.

== Main personal exhibitions ==
- 2017 "+ & -" Shen Qibin Contemporary Art Exhibition, Bellini Museum, Florence, Italy
- 2015 New Chinese Art Invitational Exhibition, Cambridge University, UK
- 2015 Post-Garden Solo Exhibition, Saatchi Gallery, London, UK
- 2012 Shen Qibin Contemporary Art Works Exhibition, Diaoyutai State Guesthouse, Beijing, China
- 2008 Intrude: art and life 366, Shanghai, China
- 2004 "China, the body everywhere?", Museum of Contemporary Art, Marseilles, France
- 2003 "Are you familiar?" Contemporary Art Works Exhibition, Nanjing Single Art Center, Nanjing, China
- 2003 "Reflection" Contemporary Art Exhibition, Kunming Shanghe Chuangku, Nanjing, China
- 2002 "Daydream "Chinese Contemporary Art Works Exhibition, Nanjing Museum, China
- 2001 "From the house of artists" Contemporary Art Works Exhibition, Phoenix Museum, Nanjing, China
- 2000 Origin & Imagery Art Works Exhibition, Nanjing, China
- 1998 Art Myth----Shen Qibin Contemporary Art Works Exhibition, National Art Museum of China, Beijing, China
- 1993 "Chinese Oil Painting Biennale", Beijing, China
- 1993 Art Myth Group Exhibition, Jiangsu Museum, Jiangsu, China
- 1992 Guangzhou Biennial Exhibition, Guangzhou, China

== Major curated exhibitions ==
- 2023.03.18-2023.04.16 The Future Is Here: The First Himalayas International Children's Art Exhibition, Himalayas Museum, Shanghai, China
- 2022.11.11-2022.12.11 Cryptoart Shanghai·Himalayas Web 3.0 Digital Art Exhibition, Himalayas Museum, Shanghai, China
- 2022.08.18-2023.05.07 Riding the Wave – Yellow Box Trend Art Exhibition, Qingdao Yelbow Box Museum, Qingdao, China
- 2018.10.27-2019.02.28 Napoleon (co-curated with Dr. Bernard Chevallier, Chief Curator of French National Museums; featured in a full-page report by Le Figaro, becoming an annual cultural event), Himalayas Museum, Shanghai, China
- 2017.09.27-2017.12.28 Miracle – The Bellini Family and the Renaissance, Himalayas Museum, Shanghai, China
- 2014.10.23-2014.10.26 FIAC (Foire Internationale d'Art Contemporain), Paris, France
- 2014.03.06-2014.03.09 The 16th Armory Show, New York, USA
- 2010.04.09-2010.10.31 Return and Departure: The First Pudong Airport Contemporary Painting Exhibition (transforming the public space of Shanghai Pudong Airport into a window showcasing Chinese contemporary civilization to the world), Terminal T2, Shanghai Pudong International Airport, Shanghai, China
- 2009.09.11-2009.11.01 Silk Thread Drawing: Liang Shaoji Solo Exhibition, Zendai MoMA, Shanghai, China
- 2009.05.24-2009.08.23 The Mist of Distrust: Yang Fudong Solo Exhibition, Zendai MoMA, Shanghai, China
- 2008.09.07-2008.10.05 Song Dong Solo Exhibition, Zendai MoMA, Shanghai, China
- 2008.07.04-2008.08.24 Intervention Plan for Suicide Phenomena on Nanjing Yangtze River Bridge I: Zhuangzi's Sedative: Qiu Zhijie Solo Exhibition, Zendai MoMA, Shanghai, China
- 2008.04.19-2008.05.18 Hostage: Wang Jianwei's Works Exhibition, Zendai MoMA, Shanghai, China
- 2008.01.19-2008.02.16 Julian Schnabel Exhibition, Zendai MoMA, Shanghai, China
- 2008.01.01-2008.12.31 Intervention: Art in Life 366 Days (an epic large-scale public art practice in China, still studied by numerous domestic and international universities and research institutions; featured in 52 special reports by Dragon TV and over 2,000 media reports at home and abroad), various locations in Shanghai, China
- 2007.11.17-2007.12.28 Soft Power – Asian Attitudes: Asian Contemporary Art Exhibition, Zendai MoMA, Shanghai, China
- 2007.07.19-2007.08.18 Soft Power – Asian Attitudes: Asian Contemporary Art Exhibition, National Museum in Poznań, Poznań, Poland
- 2007.06.01-2007.06.28 Soft Power – Asian Attitudes: Asian Contemporary Art Exhibition, Hanover Art Museum, Hanover, Germany
- 2007.05.19-2007.06.11 Per Kirkeby Exhibition, Zendai MoMA, Shanghai, China
- 2007.01.21-2007.02.25 Mobile Archive: 50th Anniversary Retrospective of documenta (co-promoted with President Luo Zhongli of Sichuan Fine Arts Institute), Zendai MoMA, Shanghai, China
- 2006.12.02-2006.12.28 Passion of Light: Dieter Roth Exhibition, Zendai MoMA, Shanghai, China
- 2006.07.23-2006.08.28 Strange Attractors: Australian Science & Art Exhibition, Zendai MoMA, Shanghai, China
- 2006.05.21-2006.07.11 Shining Pixels International New Media Art Exhibition, Zendai MoMA, Shanghai, China
- 2006.03.17 The Power of Silence: Exhibition of German Neo-Expressionist Paintings (Georg Baselitz, Jörg Immendorff, Markus Lüpertz, A.R. Penck)
- 2005.06.25-2005.08.25 Electronic Garden: International New Media Art Exhibition (inaugural exhibition of Shanghai Zendai MoMA, pioneering the integration of cutting-edge modern technology and artistic creation, and a trailblazer of international new media exhibitions in China), Zendai MoMA, Shanghai, China
- 2005.11.04-2005.11.14 Two Asias, Two Europes: International Contemporary Art Exhibition, Duolun Museum of Modern Art, Shanghai, China
- 2005.03.02-2005.04.03 Shanghai Cool: Creative Reproduction: International Art Exhibition, Duolun Museum of Modern Art, Shanghai, China
- 2004 Jean-Michel Basquiat Solo Exhibition, Duolun Museum of Modern Art, Shanghai, China
- 2004 Body·China: Contemporary Art Exhibition, Musée d'Art de Marseille, Marseille, France
- 2003.12.28-2004.02.27 Opening the Sky: Contemporary Art Exhibition of Shanghai Duolun Museum of Modern Art, Duolun Museum of Modern Art, Shanghai, China
- 2003.12.05-2003.12.20 Different Yet the Same: China-Slovenia Contemporary Art Exchange Exhibition, Duolun Museum of Modern Art, Shanghai, China
- 2003.11.01-2003.11.05 Ode to Joy: International Contemporary Art Exhibition, Nanjing Sheng Hua Art Center, Jiangsu, China
- 2002 International One-Minute Video: Inaugural Exhibition of Nanjing Sheng Hua Art Museum, Nanjing Sheng Hua Art Museum, Jiangsu, China

== Art platforms ==
- 2021 Eternal Portraits Gallery, Shanghai, China
- 2020 Huamao Art Education Museum, Ningbo, China (the first art education museum in China)
- 2019 Yellow Box Art Museum, Qingdao, China (the first contemporary art museum in Qingdao)
- 2015 New Art Research Institute, Shanghai, China
- 2013 Tianren Heyi Art Museum, Hangzhou, China (the first modern and contemporary art museum in Zhejiang)
- 2012 Shanghu Art Center, Beijing, China
- 2009 Shenyuan-founded by Mr. Shen Qibin in 2009, covers an area of 3,000 square meters. Integrating multiple functions such as a contemporary art museum, research institute, clubhouse, gallery, creative studios, and office spaces, it is not only a place for artists to create and live but also an outstanding example of the successful transformation of traditional culture into modernity.
- 2005 Shanghai Himalayas Museum (formerly known by Shanghai Zendai Museum of Modern Art)
- 2003 Shanghai Duolun Museum of Modern Art- the first official museum of modern and contemporary art in China
- 2002 Nanjing Sheng Hua Art Museum-the first modern and contemporary art museum in Jiangsu, China
- 2000 Art God Gallery - the first modern and contemporary art gallery in Jiangsu, China

== Artistic thoughts ==
- Yellow Box Theory

It advocates the integration of five aspects: tradition and contemporaneity, the West and the East, elites and the public, academia and the market, as well as art and life. It proposes to break the Western "white box" model with a "Yin-Yang to interactive model" and guide the future world's museum models and approaches from the perspective of Eastern values.

- Virtue-Tao Wildness

It explores the roots of history, tells the changes of values, reflects on the reasons why China's culture declined from prosperity over more than 2,000 years, and reconstructs the inheritance of values and the homeland of contemporary humanistic spirit.

- Merit Monument

It expounds on the current situation of the lack of faith in contemporary society and ponders over how to re-gather social energy to participate in social construction and transformation.
