= A Book from the Sky =

Book of meaningless glyphs by artist Xu Bing

Title page of Book from the Sky, in pseudo-Chinese characters. The characters “天書” do not appear anywhere in the book. Notice the attested character 𠚥 diāo on the left.

A Book from the Sky (simplified Chinese: 天书; traditional Chinese: 天書; pinyin: Tiānshū) is a book produced by Chinese artist Xu Bing in the style of woodblock prints from the Song and Ming dynasties, but filled entirely with meaningless glyphs designed to resemble traditional Chinese characters. The book, which consists of four volumes totaling 604 pages, was printed in a single print run of 126 copies between 1987 and 1991, and was first publicly exhibited in October 1988, in Beijing's National Art Museum.

The work was originally titled Mirror to Analyze the World: The Century’s Final Volume (simplified Chinese: 析世鉴－世纪末卷; traditional Chinese: 析世鍳－世紀末卷; pinyin: Xī shì jiàn—Shìjì mòjuàn), a title which "evokes the trope of the book as jian 鍳 or mirror in the venerable tradition of imperial historiography". However, the artist eventually felt that this title was "cumbersome" and "heavily influenced by Western forms and the current cultural climate", and decided to adopt the name that was already in popular use, Tianshu. In Chinese, the term tian shu (“divine writing”) originally referred to certain kinds of religious texts, but is now used to mean "gibberish"; it has thus been suggested that nonsense writing would be a more appropriate translation of the title.

== Production ==
The book is composed using a set of 4,000 characters, as this is roughly the number of characters in common usage in modern written Chinese. These characters were designed on the basis of the Kangxi radicals, so that "in terms of density of strokes and frequency of occurrence, they ... appear, on the page, to be real characters". In addition to these, page and fascicle numbers were indicated using tally marks based on the Chinese character 正.

The reasons for Xu Bing's making of the text are largely unknown and restricted to specific interviews. One stated intention was to "expose and criticise Cang Jie's crimes," in reference to the Han script becoming more cumbersome since its invention, and another that Xu Bing was after a "Classical goal." Cayley (2009) documents an interview with Xu Bing where he stated he intended to expose "the fact that Chinese literary culture is 討厭 tǎoyàn," which Cayley translates as "oppressively elaborated in a manner that is boring, tedious, something to avoid in favour of more pleasurable or valuable pursuits."

The characters were carved into individual pieces of movable type made from pear wood, in a style slightly squatter than that of Song typefaces. Initially, Xu himself typeset sample pages, and took them for printing to a factory in the village of Hanying (simplified Chinese: 韩营; traditional Chinese: 韓營), in Caiyu township (Chinese: 采育). (This was one of the last remaining traditional printing factories in China, which after the Cultural Revolution mainly produced state-sponsored reprints of classical texts using pre-Revolution woodblocks.) Later, workers at the factory typeset the pages by referring to a "model book" prepared by Xu, which contained symbols such as ↓★○☒❖ that had been placed in a one-to-one correspondence with his 4,000 pseudo-Chinese characters.

== Attested characters ==
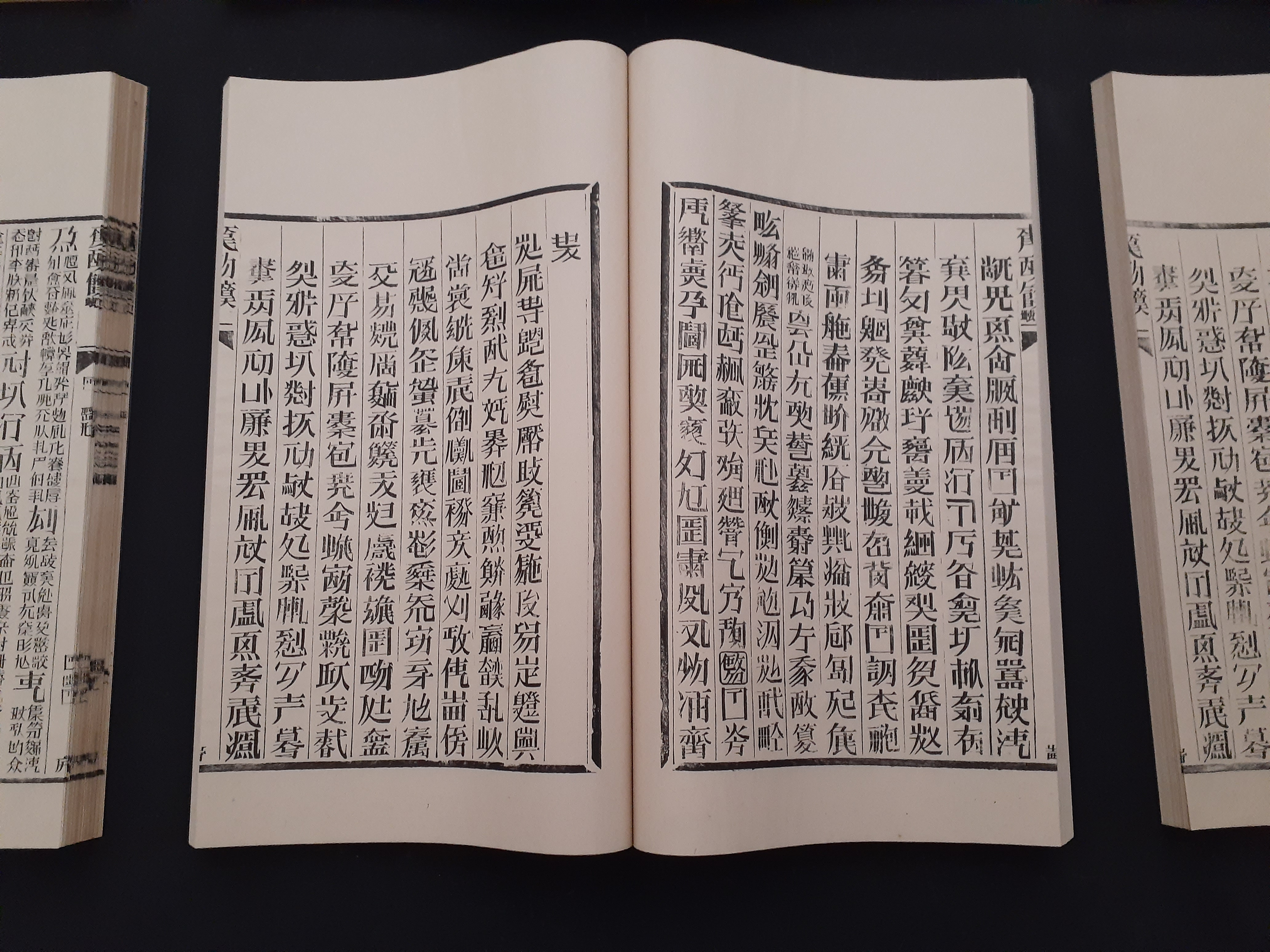
Pages from the Tianshu.

Two of the characters were found by Charles Stone to coincide with attested Chinese characters; however, one of these, 𡦺, was itself a 9th-century "forgery" by Emperor Wuzong of Tang, used to test the scholar Wang Qi. Since then, several more have been found, of which the following exist in Unicode:

- 𠚥 diāo, documented in Yupian as being to cut apart and take (斷取也。). Seen on Plate 26 of Vol.3.
- 𫭗, a Japanese placename.
- 𧰨 gèng, documented in Haipian as a synonym of 聚 jù, "collect(ion), assemble grouping".
- 𠆣 guǎ or zhuǎ, documented as a synonym of 寡 guǎ, meaning "few, scanty, deficient, lacking (in)".
- 𫼖
- 𠂇 zuǒ, another pictographic form of 手 shǒu, meaning "hand", documented in Shuowen Jiezi.
- 𠄎 nǎi, an alternate form of 乃 nǎi, a Classical Chinese copula-like word that can also be used as a second-person pronoun.
- 𡦺, a historical character produced by Emperor Wuzong of Tang.
- 𣲱, a character solely documented in 搜眞玉鏡 sōu zhēn yù jìng as being pronounced the same as 突.
- 𠂊, an ancient form of 人 rén.
- 𮱤, an erroneous form of 𪨧 lún.
- 𭣖, used in Korea.
- 𪵊, a character used in Taiwanese names.
- 𠫗 sù, a synonym of 宿 sù.
- 丿, a type of Chinese stroke.
- 丐 gài, to beg, solicit, implore, give to, beg, and/or donate.
- 厷 gōng or hóng, documented in Shuowen Jiezi as being one's upper arm or great/magnificent.
- 㦶 dié, an alternative form of 戜 dié documented in Unihan as meaning "to scrape; advantageous."
- 㤁 tiǎn, an alternative form of 忝 tiǎn "to dishonour, disgrace, be ashamed."
- 刈 yì, to mow or cut down, or a sickle/scythe. Seen on Plates 7, 8, and 13 of Vol. 1, Plate 26 of Vol.3, Plate 34, Vol. 4.
- 叻 lè, a bound form seen in local names for Singapore: 石叻 shílè or 叻埠 lìbù.
- 㕦 huà, documented in Guangyun, meaning "a loud voice."
- 亽 jí, an alternative form of 集 jí and 亼 jí "to collect or gather".
- 䍔 gōng, an alternative form of 𦊫 gōng, a full net; documented in the Jiyun.
- 㤲 qiè, thinking about one's looks or appearance, according to Shuowen Jiezi.
- ㇇, a type of Chinese stroke.
- 丆, an alternative form of 厂 "cliff".
- 㞢 zhī, an alternative form of 之 zhī and used in Bopomofo to form the /zh/ initial ㄓ; also used in Oracle Bone Script as a synonym for 有 yǒu according to Handuo.
- 凵 kǎn or qiǎn, a receptacle and Kangxi radical 17, used to form 凵, the Bopomofo /y/ initial.

Some of these characters were documented in Kangxi Dictionary, a copy of which Xu Bing had used as a reference point in the production of the text. However, given the stated intentions, as well as the small amount of legible, attested characters, these can be understood as accidental homoglyphs, and should not be taken as an indicator of the book carrying meaning.

== Reactions ==
Critical reactions to A Book from the Sky were initially dismissive. In 1990, an article in a Beijing newspaper, said to have been authored by an agent of the Ministry of Culture, described it as "ghosts building walls" (simplified Chinese: 鬼打墙; traditional Chinese: 鬼打牆; pinyin: guǐ dǎ qiáng), i.e., obfuscation for the sake of obfuscation. Meanwhile, "New Wave" artists found it too "traditional and academic". Nevertheless, the 1988 exhibition of the book at the China Art Gallery attracted a broad audience that included not only artists, but also professors and editors, some of whom visited the exhibition repeatedly in an attempt to find even a single real Chinese character. Later critics viewed the work more positively. Particularly, Lydia H. Liu of Columbia University compared the book to Lion-Eating Poet in the Stone Den by Hu Mingfu and Yuen Ren Chao, a text of verbal incomprehensibility, whereas this book is of graphical incomprehensibility, yet both maintain a sense of suspended disbelief in the consumer.

A Book from the Sky is considered to be a representative of the "1985 Fine Arts New Wave" (simplified Chinese: 85美术新潮; traditional Chinese: 85美術新潮; pinyin: Bāwǔ Měishù Xīncháo), and has been interpreted as "a primary symbol of the broad liberalization movement that characterized the years prior to the Tiananmen massacre". It has also invited comparisons with James Joyce's Finnegans Wake, as "a radical challenge to how we think about language, writing, literacy, and human-machine relationship". However, according to Xu, his main purpose was to "expose the fact that Chinese literary culture is 討厭 taoyan", a term professor John Cayley translates as 'boring' or 'tedious' in ironic comparison to the process of making the book itself. In later works such as Square Word Calligraphy and Book from the Ground, Xu takes this idea further by subverting the logographic nature of the Chinese script in ways that make it broadly accessible.
