= Ni Haifeng =

- Born: Ni Haifeng; 1964 (age 61–62); Zhoushan, China
- Education: Zhejiang Academy of Fine Arts
- Known for: Installation art, photography, video
- Notable work: Vive la Difference 2008; Trojan Horse 2008; Of the Departure and the Arrival 2005; Unfinished Self-Portrait 2003 - Ongoing
- Movement: Modernism

Ni Haifeng (born 1964) in Zhoushan, China, is an installation artist. He currently lives and works in Amsterdam, Netherlands.

== Biography ==
Ni worked as a schoolteacher at the Zhoushan Normal School, but was removed for being "too weird". He began painting onto parts of the landscape on the island where he lived in 1987, using chalk, paint, and dye to put marks on objects such as houses, stones, and trees.

By 2008 he was splitting his time between Beijing and Amsterdam.

In 2012 he exhibited in Manifesta 9.
