= Xu Bing =

Chinese artist (born 1955)

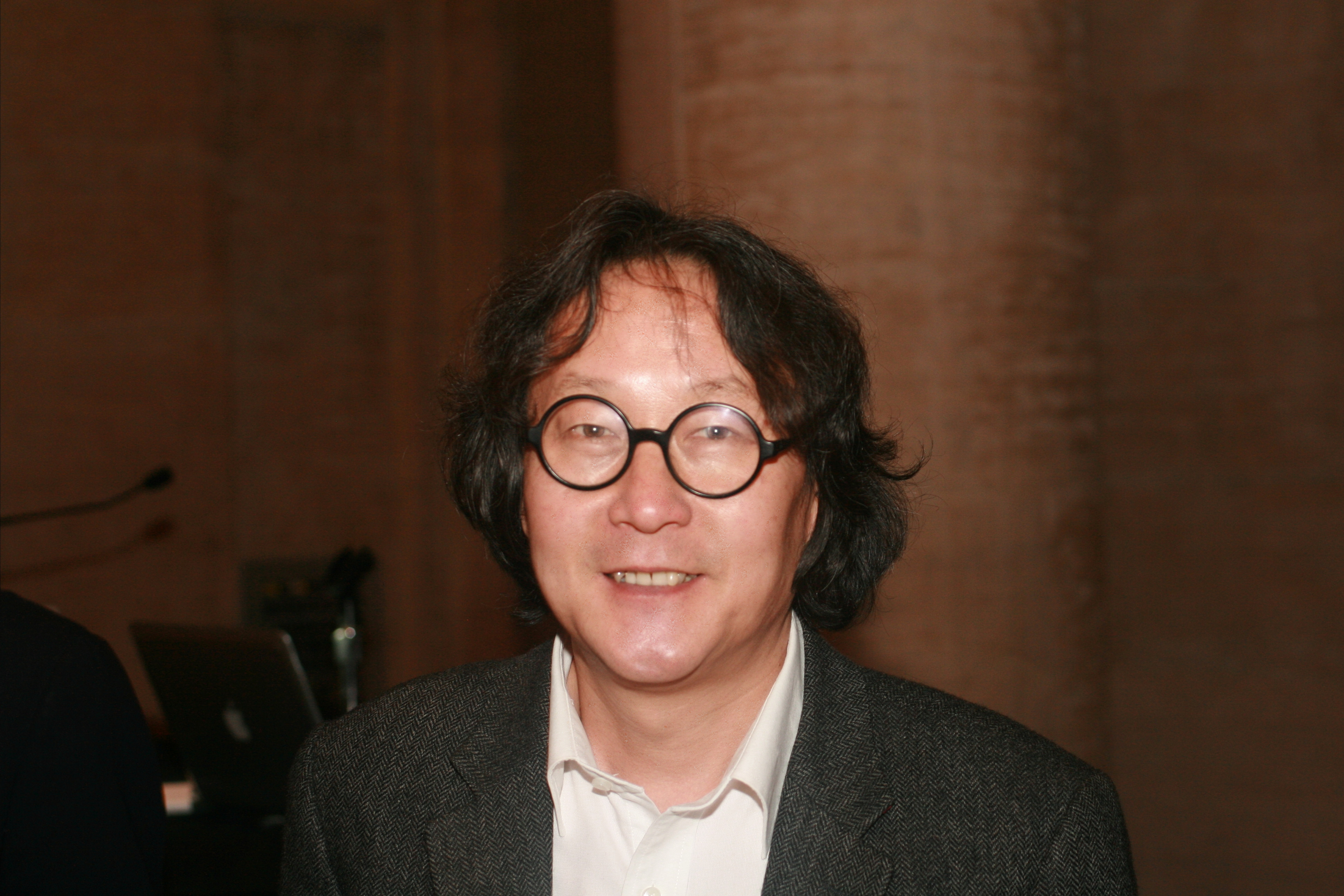
- Xu Bing at the Asian Art Museum of San Francisco, 2011
- Born: 1955 (age 70–71); Chongqing, China
- Education: Printmaking
- Known for: Installation art, Printmaking, Calligraphy
- Notable work: A Book from the Sky
- Awards: MacArthur Fellows Program

Xu Bing (Chinese: 徐冰; pinyin: Xú Bīng; born 1955) is a Chinese artist who served as vice-president of the Central Academy of Fine Arts. He is known for his printmaking skills and installation art, as well as his creative artistic use of language, words, and text and how they have affected our understanding of the world. He is an A.D. White Professor-at-Large at Cornell University. He was awarded the MacArthur Fellows Program in 1999 and the Fukuoka Prize in 2003. Xu moved to the United States in 1990 following the 1989 Tiananmen Square protests and massacre, residing there until 2008. His large installation pieces include A Book from the Sky and Ghosts Pounding the Wall.

== Biography ==
Born in Chongqing in 1955, Xu grew up in Beijing. His father was the head of the history department at Peking University. In 1975, near the end of the Cultural Revolution, he was relocated to the countryside. Returning to Beijing in 1977, he enrolled at the Central Academy of Fine Arts (CAFA) in Beijing, where he joined the printmaking department and also worked during a short period of time as a teacher, receiving his master's degree in Fine Art in 1987. After the 1989 Tiananmen Square protests and massacre, his recent work came under scrutiny from the government and received harsh criticism for what was perceived as a critique of the Chinese government. Due to the political pressure and artistic restrictions of the post-Tiananmen period in China, Xu moved to the United States in 1990 where he was invited by the University of Wisconsin–Madison. He then resided to the United States until his appointment as vice-president of the Beijing CAFA in 2008.

In 1990–91, Xu had his first exhibition in the United States at the University of Wisconsin–Madison's Elvehjem Museum of Art (now Chazen Museum of Art) including his installations A Book from the Sky and Ghosts Pounding the Wall. In Book from the Sky, the artist invented 4,000 characters and hand-carved them into wood blocks, then used them as movable type to print volumes and scrolls, which are displayed laid out on the floor and hung from the ceiling. The vast planes of text seem to convey ancient wisdom, but are in fact unintelligible. The Glassy Surface of a Lake, a site-specific installation for the Elvehjem, was on view in 2004–05. In this work, a net of cast aluminum letters forming a passage from Henry David Thoreau's Walden stretches across the museum's atrium and pours down into an illegible pile of letters on the floor below.

Working in a wide range of media, Xu creates installations that question the idea of communicating meaning through language, demonstrating how both meanings and written words can be easily manipulated. He received a MacArthur Foundation grant in July 1999, presented to him for "originality, creativity, self-direction, and capacity to contribute importantly to society, particularly in printmaking and calligraphy."

In 2003 he exhibited at the then new Chinese Arts centre in Manchester, and in 2004 he won the inaugural "Artes Mundi" prize in Wales for Where does the dust collect itself?, an installation using dust he collected in New York City on the day after the destruction of the World Trade Center. He won also a half year of free work and study at the American Academy in Berlin 2004.

Xu was appointed the new vice president of the Central Academy of Fine Arts, March 2008.

== Art ==
=== Early works ===
While at the Central Academy of Fine Arts, Xu Bing studied the Socialist Realism style of art so predominant during the Maoist era. After graduating with his degree in printmaking, the artist veered away and created simple woodcuts such as Shattered Jade (1977) and Bustling Village on the Water (1980–81, 繁忙的水乡). In 1987, Xu returned to his training in printmaking to create large and elaborate installation pieces like Book from the Sky (1987) and Ghosts Pounding the Wall (1990).

=== Installation pieces ===
==== A Book from the Sky ====
Xu Bing's Tianshu ("Book from the Sky") is a large installation featuring precisely laid out rows of books and hanging scrolls with written "Chinese" texts. The work was controversial for containing 4,000 characters which Bing intended to look Chinese but were completely meaningless according to standard Mandarin.

This piece was well received in China until 1989, whereupon the social and political drama of the Tiananmen Square protests led the government to reevalute Tianshu. Leaving China in 1991 for the United States, Xu Bing continued to explore and express his thoughts on deconstructing language. His work found success among Western audiences, and he soon became well-known in the world of contemporary Chinese art.

==== Ghosts Pounding the Wall ====
Using his background in print-making, in May and June 1990 Xu Bing and a team of art students, with help from local residents, began work on a rubbing from a section of the Great Wall at Jinshanling. In order to create the rubbings, Xu Bing used traditional Chinese methods and materials for stone rubbing, including rice paper and ink. Measuring 32m x 15m, the resulting installation piece consists of 29 rubbings of different sections of the Great Wall.

As in the case of many of his works, Xu directly related his colossal piece, Ghosts Pounding the Wall, to the political situation in China. While surveying his work while installed at Elvehjem Museum of Art, Xu said that his Great Wall represents "a kind of thinking that makes no sense and is very conservative, a really closed-in thinking that symbolizes the isolationism of Chinese politics." The prints of the Great Wall rise up on either side of the exhibit, making the viewer seem small and insignificant in comparison to the massive, looming representations of solid stone walls.

==== Square Word Calligraphy ====
"" an example of Xu Bing's 'Square Word' calligraphy, combining Latin characters into forms that resemble Chinese characters. The word pictured is 'wiki'.

From 1994 he started a new project, in which he adapted Latin alphabets into the form of Chinese characters. He called this New English Calligraphy, and gave lessons in how to write the characters. The artist often signs his work as "" (the Square Word Calligraphic form of Xu Bing). also features artistically in the header of the artist's website.

==== Background Story ====
In his series Background Story, Xu Bing uses unusual materials in order to create a deceptively typical Chinese Scroll Painting. From the front, the piece very much resembles a traditional Shan Shui (Landscape) scroll painting, with images of mountains, trees, and rivers. However, when seen from behind, the viewer is surprised to find that the beautiful "painting" is in fact created by using the shapes and shadows of random natural plant debris. Once again, Xu challenges his audience's basic assumptions and shows them that everything is not always as it first seems. In 2022, Xu created a version of Background Story for Cornell University's Herbert F. Johnson Museum of Art based on a Ming Dynasty work in its collection, Woodcutter in Winter Mountains, by Yang Xun. Through his reconsideration of the earlier landscape painting, the artist practices fang, a traditional form of artistic imitation.

==== Phoenix project ====
In 2008, after returning to China to take the position at the Central Academy of Fine Arts, Xu Bing was asked to create a sculpture for the atrium of the World Financial Center, which was then being developed in Beijing. He was shocked by primitive working conditions he saw at the construction site, later saying that they "made my skin quiver." He was inspired to construct two large sculptures in the form of birds that are made largely out of construction debris and tools that he salvaged from the site. The larger sculpture, 100 feet (30 meters) long, is identified as a male and named Feng in accordance with the Chinese phoenix tradition. The smaller one is 90 feet (27 meters) long and is a female named Huang. Originally planned to take four months, the sculptures ultimately took two years to build; by that time the developers of the complex had decided the sculptures did not meet their needs. They were displayed at the Today Art Museum in Beijing and at the Shanghai World Expo before coming to the United States in 2012. After a year at the Massachusetts Museum of Contemporary Art, they were then moved to the Cathedral of St. John the Divine in New York City, where they were unveiled to the public on 1 March 2014. They were suspended from the ceiling of the nave, where they are now expected to spend about a year. The Phoenix sculpture is the subject of the documentary Xu Bing: Phoenix by Daniel Traub.

=== Later mediums ===
Xu Bing's art medium has evolved over the years, morphing from one style to the next: print-making and wood-block carving, installation art, live installation art, metalwork and sculpture, landscaping, and even virtual and digital mediums.

Taking installation art a step further, Xu focused on live installation art by using animals in his exhibits, such as in the case of the Silkworm Series and a Case Study of Transference (using silkworms and pigs, respectively) in 1994, or by showcasing sheep in The Net (1997). Later he explored the combination of modern and traditional mediums, as in the case of Background Story (2004–present) where his work imitates a traditional Chinese brush and ink scroll from the front, but is in fact designed by means of the projected shadows of plants and sticks. Even more recently, Xu has delved into sculpture and metalworking, as seen in Monkeys Grasp for the Moon (2001) and the Phoenix Project (2010).

== Influences and themes ==
Xu Bing's art mostly reflects cultural issues which raged during his early life in China. Most notably, the cultural and linguistic reforms enacted by the Chinese Communist Party under Mao Zedong's leadership impact modern Chinese artists who lived through this period, especially the Cultural Revolution (1966-1976). Xu describes his art as reflecting "the genes of an artist with a socialist background. That is something which cannot be concealed and will always reveal itself in the end."

Xu plays incessantly with the role, purpose, and reality of language. Early in his life his father would make him write a page of characters a day, encouraging him to not only copy their form to perfection, but also to capture their spirit, their essence.

It was not until 2008 that Xu set aside his post-Maoist reactionary art and invested in other topics. For example, he took on environmental projects such as Forest Project, which encouraged the "uninterrupted flow of funds from developed countries to Kenya, earmarked for the planting of new trees."

At the turn of the millennium, a new defining social pattern emerged after the terrorist attacks in the United States on 9/11, 2001. Tension grew between the West and the Middle East, finally exploding into what was labeled as "the war on terror." This situation gave rise to social themes of anxiety and hopelessness, which eventually have seeped into the realm of the arts. Even so, some artists like Xu chose to explore the serenity found in the midst of chaos, as illustrated in his work Where does the Dust Itself Collect? (2004, 2011). For this piece, the artist gathered dust from the aftermath of the collapse of the Twin Towers in New York after September 11, 2001, and uses it to recreate the gray film that covered Manhattan in the weeks following the attacks. Stenciled in the dust, a Buddhist poem reads, "As there is nothing from the first, where does the dust itself collect?" Using this tragedy as an expression of the human narrative, Xu contemplates the relationship between the material and the spiritual, and he explores "the complicated circumstances created by different world perspectives."

== Awards ==
- Pollock Krasner Foundation Prize (1998)
- MacArthur Award (1999)
- Fukuoka Asian Culture Prize (2003)
- American Academy in Berlin Coca-Cola Fellowship (2004)
- Artes Mundi Prize (2004)
- The Youth Friends Award, New York (2005)
- International Association of Art Critics Award for "Best Installation or Single Work of Art in a Museum, New England" (2006)
- Southern Graphics Council Lifetime Achievement Award (2006)
- Honorary Doctor of Humane Letters, Columbia University, New York (2010)

== Partial list of works ==
- Lanman Shanhua (Brilliant Mountain Flowers) Magazine (1975–1976)
- A Book from the Sky (1987–1991)
- Ghosts Pounding the Wall (1990–1991)
- A.B.C.... (1991–1994)
- Post Testament (1992–1993)
- Brailliterate (1993)
- A Case Study in Transference (1994)
- Introduction to Square-Word Calligraphy (1994–1996)
- Oxford Dictionary: Bird Definition (1994–1996)
- American Silkworm Series (1995)
- Lost Letters (1997)
- Landscript Postcards (1999–2000)
- Red Book (Tobacco Project) (2000)
- The Living Word (2001)
- Book from the Ground (2003–2012)
- Ten Thousand Trees (2004)
- Monkeys Grasping for the Moon (2008-ongoing)
- The Living Word 3 (2011)
- Book from the Ground: from point to point (2013)

== Bibliography ==
- Pseudo-Languages: A Conversation with Wenda Gu, Xu Bing, and Jonathan Hay. Art Journal 58, no. 3 (1999): 86-99. doi:10.2307/777863.
- The Character of Characters: An Animation By Xu Bing (2012). Asian Art Museum of San Francisco. ISBN 978-0939117659.
- Xu Bing: Phoenix (2016). Thircuir. ISBN 978-9881607928.
- Book from the Sky to Book from the Ground (2020). Acc Art Books. ISBN 978-1788840620.

== Films ==
- The Enduring Passion for Ink (2013) by Britta Erickson
