= Chambers Fine Art =

Coordinates: 40.745732°N 74.00716°W

Chambers Fine Art is an art gallery based in New York City and Beijing that specializes in Chinese contemporary art. Opened in New York in 2000 by Christophe Mao. Notable Chinese artists who had their first solo show in the United States at Chambers include: Lu Shengzhong, Shi Jinsong, Hong Hao, Qiu Zhijie, Hong Lei, and Chi Peng.

In 2007 Chambers Fine Art opened a second 8,600-square-foot (800 m^{2}) gallery-space designed by the artist, Ai Weiwei, in the Caochangdi district of Beijing. The inaugural exhibition Net: Reimagining Space, Time and Culture was organized by Wu Hung, and included works by Chinese contemporary artists Ai Weiwei, He Yunchang, Hong Hao, Hong Lei, Lu Shengzhong, Qiu Zhijie, Rong Rong & inri, Shi Jinsong, Song Dong, Wang Jianwei, Wang Tiande, Wu Jian’an, Yin Xiuzhen, Yu Hong, Guo Hongwei, Zhan Wang, Zhang Peili, Zheng Guogu.

In October 2009, Chambers Fine Art moved its New York gallery to a 2,300-square-foot (210 m^{2}) ground-floor space on 19th street in Chelsea's gallery district.

== History ==
Chambers Fine Art is named after the distinguished British architect, Sir William Chambers who, in addition to his architectural practice, was a leading exponent of Chinese principles in garden design in the late eighteenth century. Inspired by the example of Chambers, Christophe W. Mao, founder and director of the gallery since 2000, has organized a stimulating series of exhibitions that have introduced the work of some of the best artists active in China today to an American audience.

The gallery program has alternated between monographic exhibitions devoted to the work of established artists and thematic exhibitions organized by recognized scholars in the field. Thus, the first exhibition in the gallery, First Encounter, was devoted to the work of the outstanding paper-cut artist Lu Shengzhong who converted the gallery space into a vividly colored "temple" that evoked another aspect of life in China than the contemporary urban culture explored by so many younger artists. Other memorable solo exhibitions in the last eight years have been devoted to the work of Hong Hao, Wang Tiande, Wang Jianwei, Qiu Shihua, Rong Rong and inri, Hong Lei and Qiu Zhijie.

In contrast group exhibitions beginning with Cement: Marginal Space in Contemporary Art (2002) and Too Much Flavor (2003) and continuing to Blog It: New Wave of New Wave (2008) have introduced the work of a younger generation of Chinese artists to the American audience. These carefully selected “reports” on the latest developments in China contrast with monographic exhibitions devoted to well-established artists whose work is frequently being shown for the first time in the United States.

== First Chinese Pavilion at Venice Biennale ==
In 2003, Chambers Director, Christophe Mao, agreed to sponsor the first ever Chinese Pavilion at the 50th Venice Biennale, the major contemporary art exhibition which takes place in Venice, Italy every two years. Five Chinese artists were selected to represent China, including Lu Shengzhong, who was the first contemporary Chinese artist exhibited by Chambers when it opened in 2000. However, because of the SARS crisis, the Chinese Pavilion was canceled. In 2005, for the 51st Venice Biennale, the first official Chinese Pavilion was built by the Chinese Ministry of Culture and Chambers Fine Art provided sponsorship for the exhibition "Virgin Garden – Immersion", which included the artists Yung Ho Chang, Liu Wei, Sun Yuan & Peng Yu, Wang Qiheng and Xu Zhen.

== Architecture ==
Since the gallery opened in the Chelsea neighborhood of New York City in 2000, Chambers Fine Art has opened two additional exhibition spaces which have both been recognized for their architectural merits. In 2007, Chambers Fine Art opened a second gallery in the Caochangdi district of Beijing. In 2008, an additional storage and exhibition space known as "ArtFarm" was opened on a rural piece of private land in Salt Point, New York. Both of these buildings were designed by the Swiss architectural firm, HHF Architects, in conjunction with renowned Chinese artist and architect, Ai Weiwei, who is widely known for collaborating on the design of the "Bird's Nest" stadium built for the 2008 Beijing Olympics. In 2009, HHF Architects received the "best architects 10" gold prize for the ArtFarm project. Described by the architects, "The outer shape is a consequence of the use of a pre-engineered and easy to assemble type of steel building, which often gets used for agricultural purposes in that area. With its abstract metallic appearance the structure becomes an equal member of a whole group of sculptures which are spread out in the landscape."

== See also ==
- Chinese fine art
