= Groninger Museum =

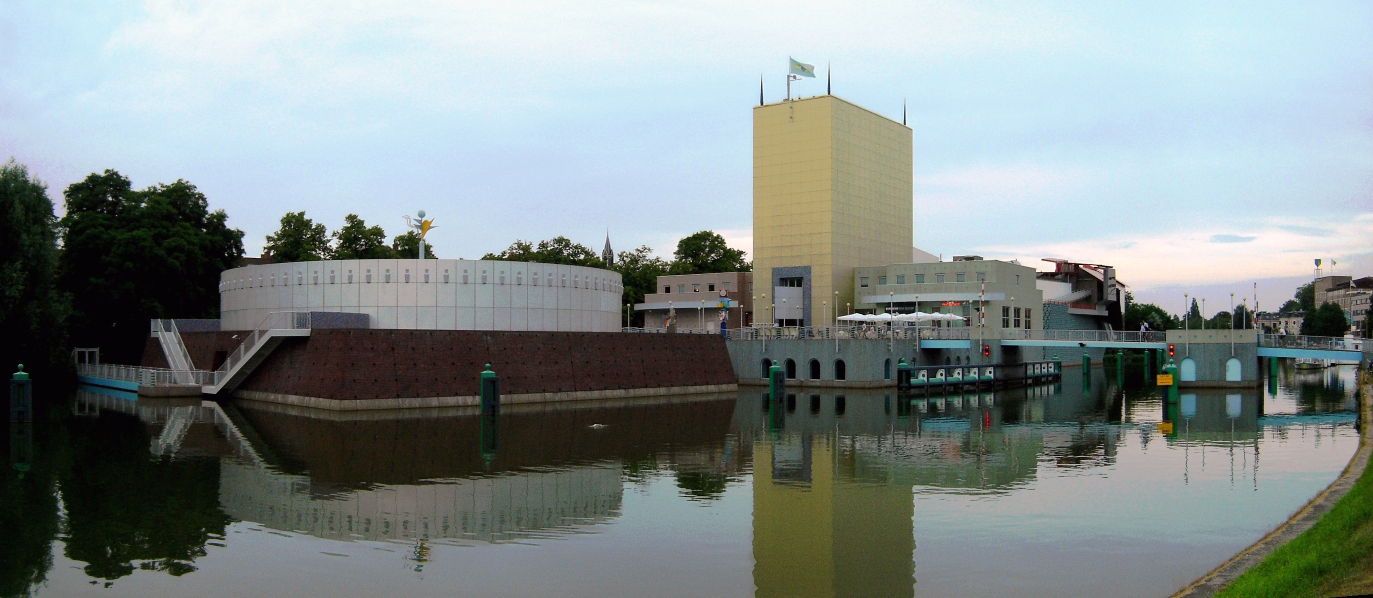
- The museum on the Verbindingskanaal

- Location in the province Groningen in the Netherlands
- Established: 1874
- Location: Museumeiland 1 Groningen, Netherlands
- Coordinates: 53°12′44″N 6°33′58″E
- Type: Art museum
- Visitors: 213,000 (2017 est.)
- Curators: Edgar Pelupessy, Ruud Schenk, Marlon Steensma, Anneke de Vries, Lecong Zhou
- Public transit access: Groningen
- Website: www.groningermuseum.nl

The Groninger Museum (Dutch pronunciation: [ˈɣroːnɪŋər myˈzeːjʏm]) is an art museum in the city of Groningen in the Netherlands. The museum exhibits modern and contemporary art of local, national, and international artists.

The museum opened in 1874. The current post-modernist building consists of three main pavilions designed individually by architects Philippe Starck, Alessandro Mendini, Coop Himmelb(l)au, and was completed in 1994.

In 2024, there were just under 166,000 visitors to the museum. The current director is Roos Gortzak.

== History ==
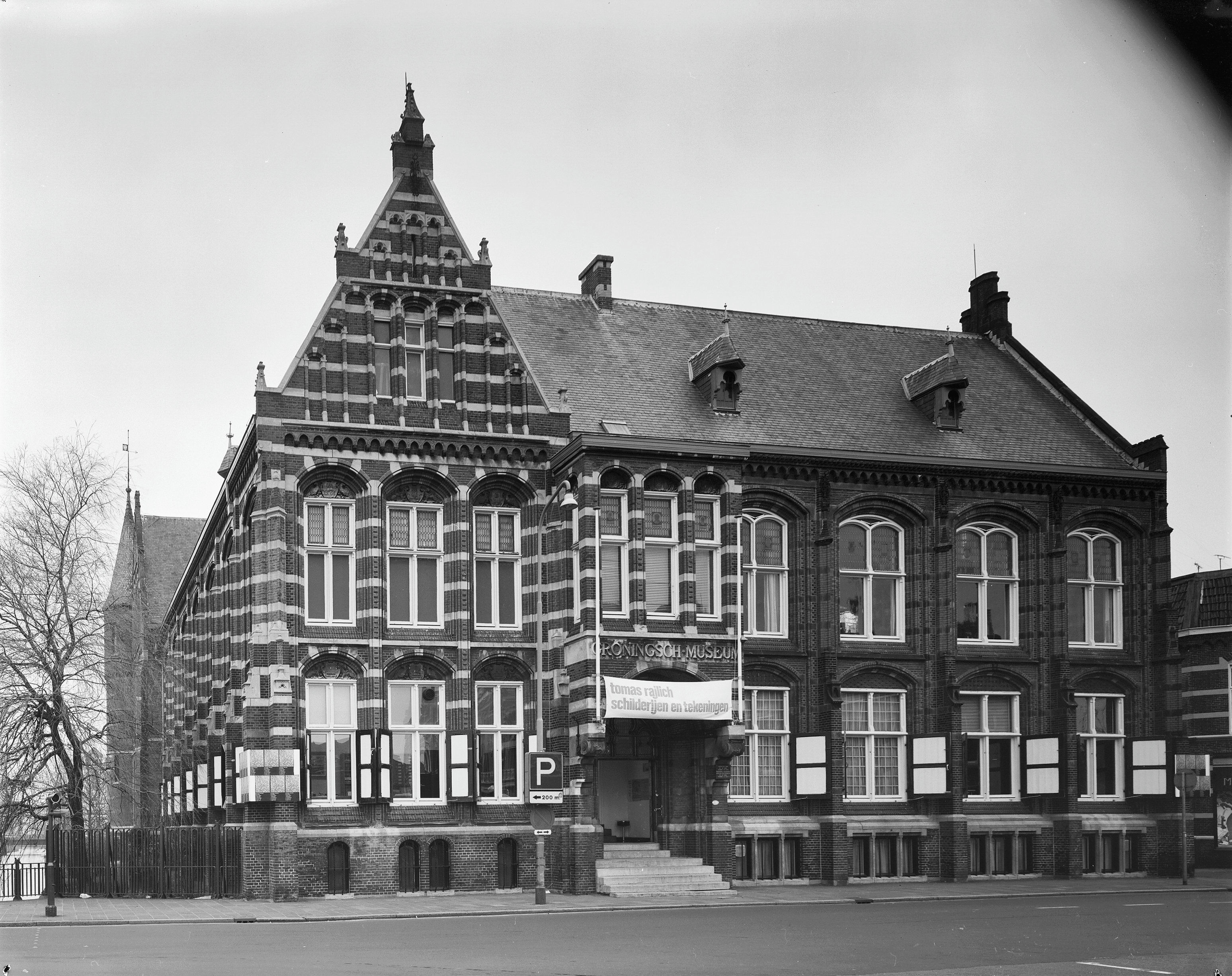
The former building of the Groninger Museum in 1975

The Groninger Museum was founded in 1874 and opened its own building twenty years later on the Praediniussingel, in 1894. The Menkemaborg, a historic mansion, was donated to the Groninger Museum by the heirs of its last inhabitants in 1921. The current building of the museum was opened in 1994.

== Building ==
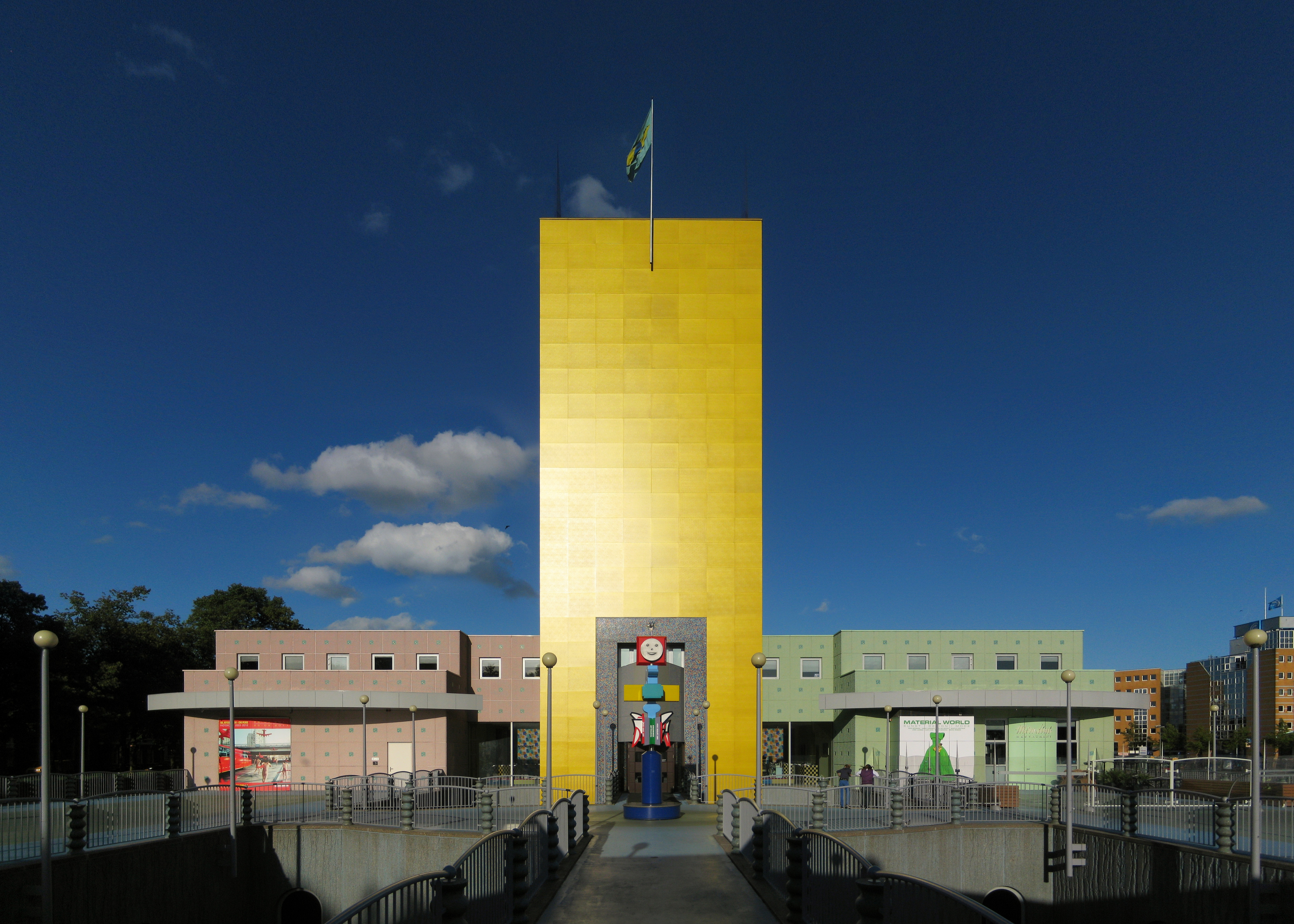
Entrance of the museum in 2011, with the yellow tower that was designed by Alessandro Mendini

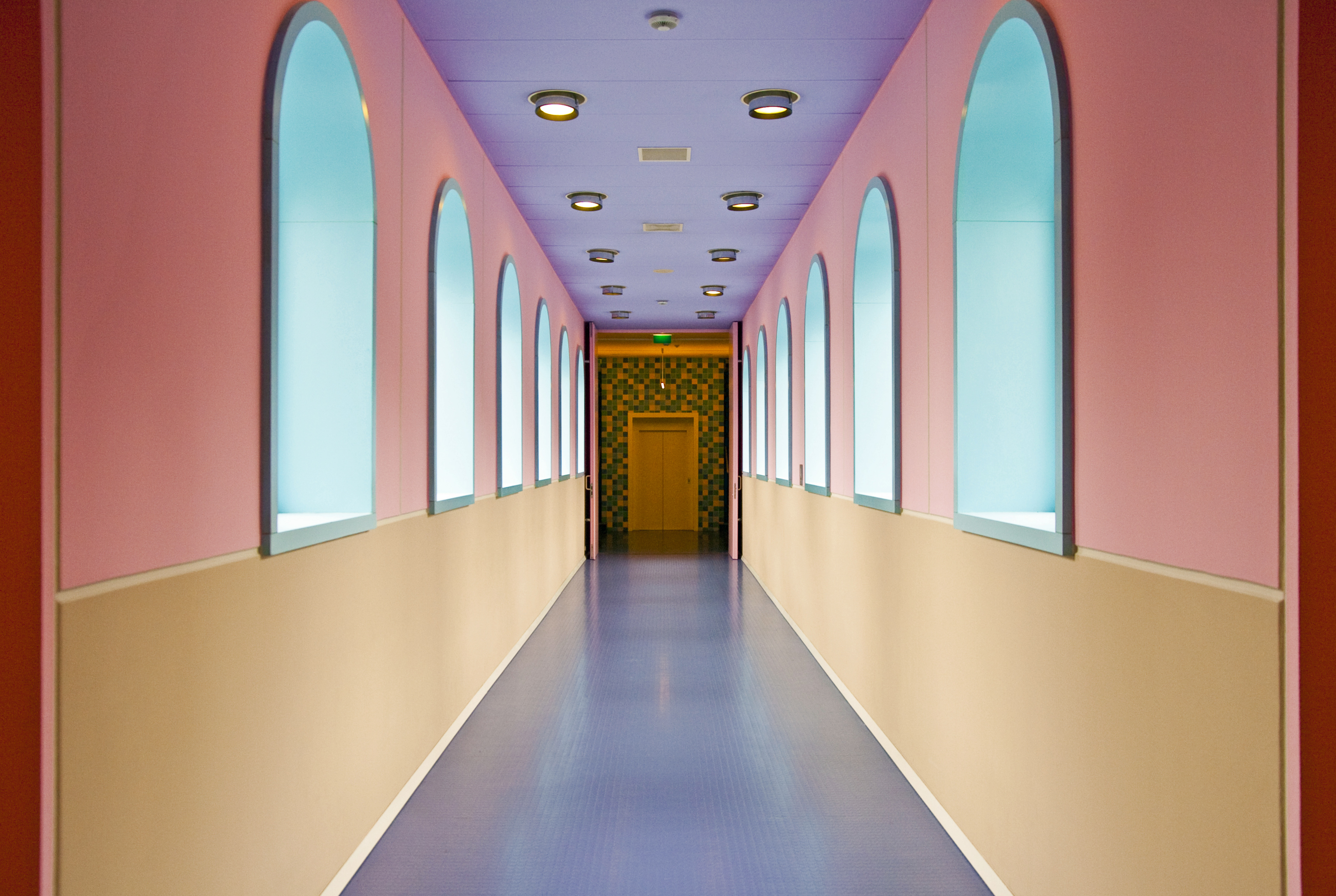
Corridor inside the museum in 2009

The postmodernist structures that form the Groninger Museum stand in a canal opposite Groningen railway station. They consist of three main pavilions: a silver cylindrical building designed by Philippe Starck, a yellow tower by Alessandro Mendini, and a pale blue deconstructivist space by Coop Himmelb(l)au. A bridge that connects the museum to the train station is part of a cycling and walking path to the centre of the city.

The architecture's futuristic and colourful style echoes the Italian Post Modern designs of the Memphis Group. Mendini, a former member of the firm, who is noted for his furniture and industrial designs, was asked by museum director Frans Haks in 1990 to design the new museum. Haks wanted something extravagant and insisted on non-architects to create the conceptual studies. American artist Frank Stella was originally approached to design one of the pavilions. However, his plan turned-out to be too expensive because he wanted his structure completely built out of Teflon. The municipality then invited Coop Himmelb(l)au to replace him for the commission.

The museum was mainly paid for by Gasunie, the Dutch natural gas company. The company was celebrating its 25th anniversary and wanted to give the city of Groningen a present. Haks, wanting to move out of the old and insufficient exhibition space, suggested a new museum building. Gasunie agreed to Hak's proposal and granted 25 million guilders for the project.

Alderman Ypke Gietema, a strong proponent of the new museum, was responsible for siting the museum at its present location despite acrimonious objections. During site preparation, protesters managed to halt construction for one year via the high court. Citizens' objections centred on the controversial design, fearing their homes would not sell with such a peculiar and eccentric structure nearby. Despite the controversy, building resumed in 1992 and it was completed in 1994. Local residents had to get used to the shapes and colours of the building, but it soon became a popular success.

== Collections ==
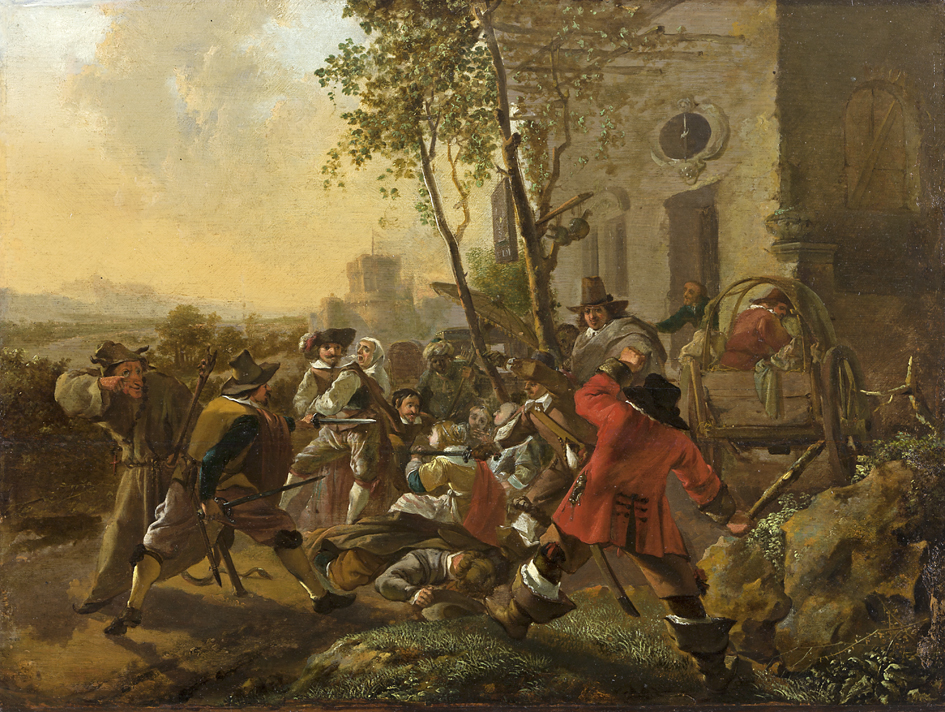
Street Fight: an anonymous 17th-century painting that forms part of the museum's 'visual arts 1500 - 1950' collection

The museum has a collection of around 80,000 objects. These are organised into five collecting areas:

- Archeology and history of Groningen
- Visual arts 1500-1950
- Art after 1950
- Contemporary art, design, photography, and fashion
- East Asian Ceramics

Around 30,00 of the collections have been digitised and are available to search via an online portal.

== Exhibitions ==
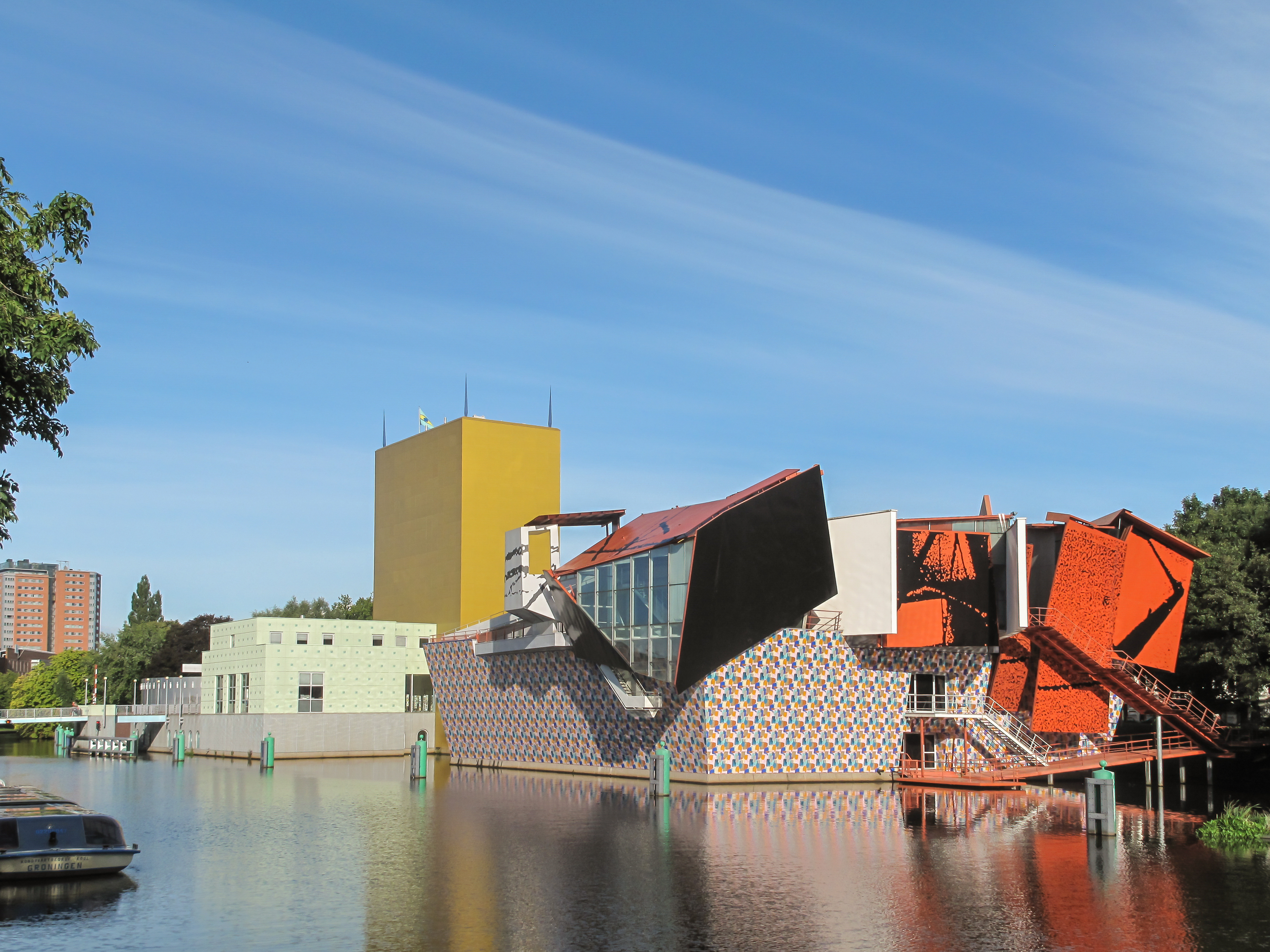
Exhibition space of the museum in 2012

The Groninger Museum is home to various exhibitions of local, national, and international works of art, most of them modern and abstract. Some have provoked controversy, such as the photo exhibition of Andres Serrano, but others are more conventional such as the exhibition of the works by Ilya Repin, the "Russian Rembrandt". While the exhibition David Bowie Is was taking place at the museum the death of David Bowie was announced. The museum responded by opening a condolence register and opening its doors to visitors on Monday (while the museum is normally closed).

2002

- Ilya Repin

2006

- Marc Quinn, Recent Sculpture

2007

- Akseli Gallen-Kallela (1865–1931), the Spirit of Finland
- P. Struycken, Digital Paradise

2008

- Russian Legends, Folk Tales and Fairy Tales
- The circle around Kirchner. Expressionismus aus den Bergen
- Ancient Bronzes: Masterpieces from the Shanghai Museum
- Go China! Assen - Groningen

2009

- Asian Ceramics
- Cuba: Art and History from 1868 to the Present
- From Herman Collenius to Jeff Koons, courtesy of the Vereniging Rembrandt
- J.W. Waterhouse (1849–1917), the Modern Pre-Raphaelite

2010

- Now in the former Groninger Museum - 100 years of collecting (1894–1994)
- Bernhard Willhelm & Jutta Kraus
- Brücke, German Expressionism (1905–1913)
- Folkert de Jong

2011

- The Unknown Russia
- Me, myself and I by Chi Peng
- Silver in Groningen
- The Firebird by Othilia Verdurmen
- Highlights From The Museum Collection

2012

- Yin Xiuzhen
- Painting Canada
- Iris van Herpen
- Iconen van het Groningerland. Jan Altink (1885–1971) (Icons of the Groningen Countryside. Jan Altink (1885–1971))
- Famille Verte
- Azzedine Alaïa in de 21e eeuw (Azzedine Alaïa in the 21st Century)
- Eigen collectie - Oude en nieuwe portretten (Old and new portraits from the Groninger Museum collection)
- Studio Job & het Groninger Museum (Studio Job & the Groninger Museum)
- Bijzondere huwelijkslepels uit de middeleeuwen

2013

- Diane KW. At World's End
- Draken en lange Lijzen. Chinees Porselein uit de eigen collectie (Dragons and Lange Lijzen. Chinese porcelain from the Museum's own collection)
- Vrouwen van de Revolutie (Women of the Revolution)
- Nordic Art 1880 - 1920
- Groninger Museum eert grondlegger (Groninger Museum honours founder)
- Marc Bijl. Urban Gothic
- Gronings zilver uit de collectie Hofman-Westerhof (Gronings silver from the Hofman-Westerhof collection)
- De Ploeg - Eigen collectie (De Ploeg - Groninger Museum Collection)

2015

- H.N. Werkman
- David Bowie Is

2016

- Rodin

2017

2019

- Strijd! 100 jaar vrouwenkiesrecht / Battle! 100 years of women's suffrage

== Governance and Administration ==
Year	Visitors
2008	256,000
2009	227,700
2010	88,469
2011	214,000
2012	180,000
2013	197,517
2014	173,355
2015	209,500 (est.)
2016	287,682
2017	213,200
2018	236,023
2019	324,296
2020	116,167
2021	94,361
2022	141,875
2023	243,700
2024	165,905

=== Directors ===
- Jos de Gruyter (1955 - 1963)
- Bram Westers
- Frans Haks (until 1996)
- Reyn van der Lugt
- Kees van Twist
- Andreas Blühm (2012 - 2025)
- Roos Gortzak (2025 onwards)

The Groninger Museum is a member of Museumhuis Groningen (Groningen Museum House), which is an umbrella organization for museums and heritage institutions in the province of Groningen.

=== Visitor Numbers ===
Since 2008, the museum visitor numbers have fluctuated between from around to 150,000 to 300,000 visitors per year. 2019 was the most successful ever, with over 324,000 visitors. Exceptions to have been 2010, when the museum was closed for renovation from April to December., and during the Covid-19 pandemic when the museum was partially shut in 2020 and 2021. It is the most visited museum of the province of Groningen.
