= Werkman =

Werkman is a surname. Notable people with the surname include:

- Chester Hamlin Werkman (1893–1962), American microbiologist
- Hans Werkman (born 1939), Dutch writer and literary critic
- Hendrik Nicolaas Werkman (1882–1945), Dutch artist, typographer, and printer
  - H.N. Werkman College
- Nick Werkman, American basketball player for Seton Hall and the Boston Celtics

== See also ==
- Berkman
- Workman (surname)
