= Hong Lei =

Hong Lei may refer to:

- Hong Lei (artist) (born 1960), Chinese artist
- Hong Lei (diplomat) (born 1969), Chinese diplomat and politician
