= Zhan Wang =

Chinese sculptor

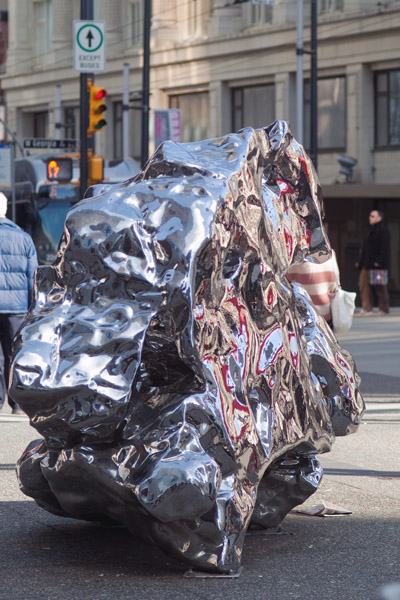
Artificial Rock #143 outside Vancouver City Centre station

Zhan Wang (Chinese: 展望; pinyin: Zhǎn Wàng; born 1962 in Beijing) is a Chinese sculptor.

"Zhan Wang's career as an iconoclast began with In a Twinkling (1993), an installation of superrealist figurative sculptures. The figures' style was not new, but the method of installation was: after creating a group of figures in poses of arrested movement, he propped them in unlikely positions outside a building, creating a surrealistic vision of a world gone awry," wrote Britta Erickson in Art Journal.

He is known for being a contemporary Chinese sculptor; however, he is also known in other art forms such as installations, photography and video. His pieces consist of conceptual ideas where he "embraces and subverts several other major traditions in modern art, both Chinese and Euro-American". Many of his works include the use of simplistic object that serve a purpose of telling a complex idea. Many of his ideas that are expressed through his works pertain to Chinese culture. In 1993, he was featured in his first exhibit and since then he has been showcased in over 125 exhibits, 24 of which were solo exhibitions. His last exhibition was "My Personal Universe" in 2012.

== Education ==
As a child, he was interested in art. Later on, he got a formal art education in 1978 at Beijing Industrial Arts College. His instructor there was specialized in the Soviet style of sculpture that he primarily what he studied during this time. Then he went to study at the Central Academy of Fine Arts in 1983, where he studied in the Sculpture Department. It wasn't until after he graduated from the art schools that he then started to get into modern sculptors.

== Art works ==
=== Scholar Rocks ===
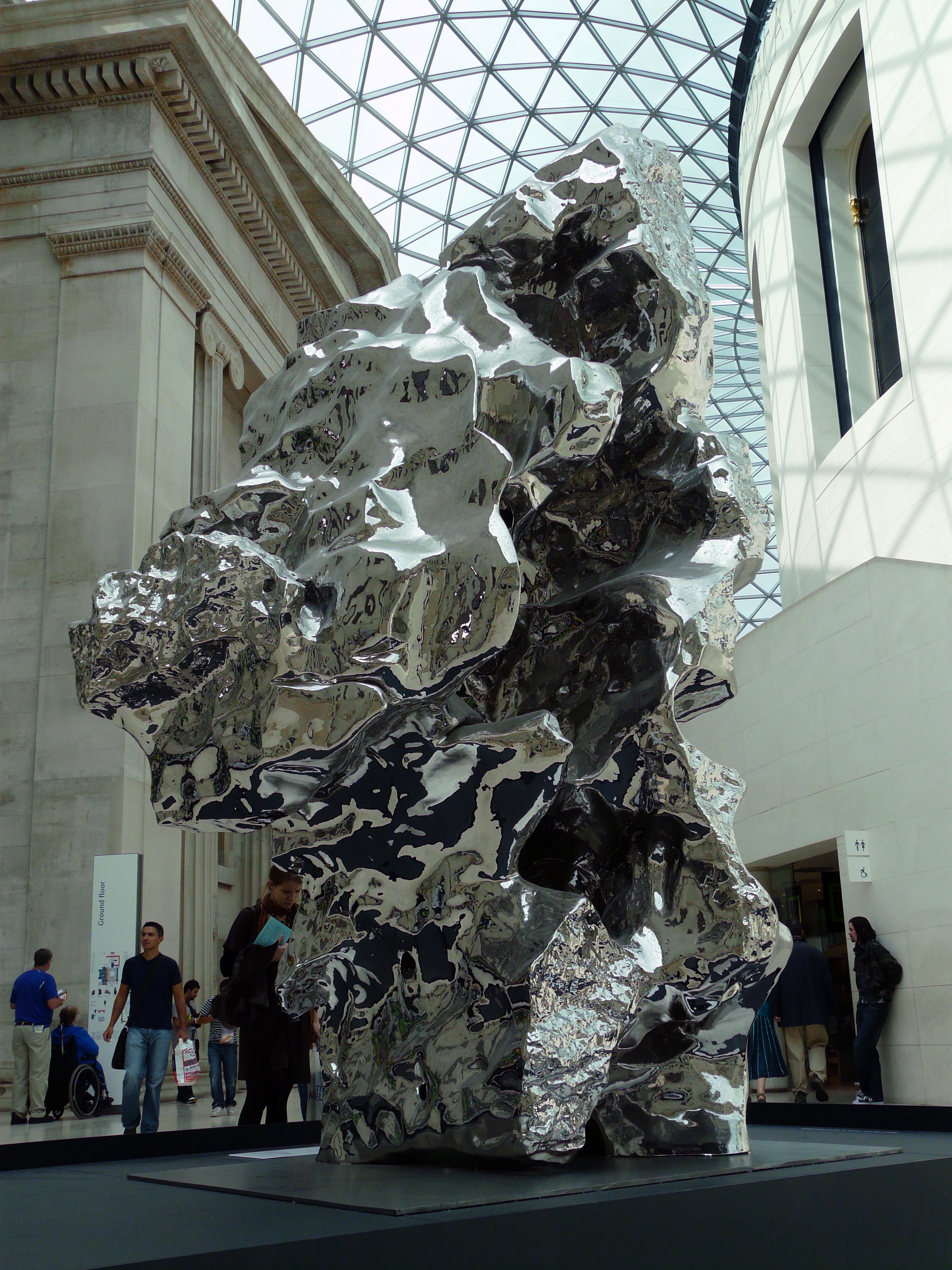
Rock Number 59 on display at the British Museum in 2008

His style concentrates primarily on abstract forms, which he calls floating stones, which are large, highly textured rock-like pieces coated in chrome. They are also called mountain or scholar's rocks. Wang refers to the series, which he began creating in 1995, as Artificial Jiashanshi. Many of Zhan Wang's works concentrate on abstract forms, that go by many names such as floating stones, artificial rocks, or the most famous, scholar rocks. These are large, highly textured rock-like pieces coated in chrome. These rocks are also known as Scholar Rocks. In the Chinese culture, the rock holds a high value; rocks have been thought to possess the purest qi, or vital energy, and collected as objects of art and tools of meditation. His fascination with the concept of the rock may have led to some of his most famous works or maybe the placement of artificial rocks outside the entrance of modern buildings in China. It is seen that even though China was going through change in modernizing the world around they still held on to parts of the traditional culture. He wrote in 1966:

Placed in a traditional courtyard, rockery satisfied people's desire to return to Nature by offering them stone fragments from Nature. But huge changes in the world have made this traditional ideal increasingly out of date. I have thus used stales steel to duplicate and transform natural rockery into manufactured forms. The material's glittering surface, ostentatious glamour, and illusory appearance make it an ideal medium to convey new dreams.

This was the emergence of two eras that Zhan Wang thought "formed an interesting juxtaposition". The concept of the rock or maybe the placing of rocks outside these modern builds lead to the creations of Zhan Wang, which are known as the "artificial rocks". Zhan's scholar rocks takes the concept of new technologies and cultural traditions for a modern collaboration. However, he considers these works authentic and depiction of Chinese history in postmodern world. To create these rocks he applies a pliable sheet of steel over the rocks and then hammers it to reproduce the same surface of the rocks.

Kenneth Baker of the San Francisco Chronicle wrote, in 2011:

Artificial Rock #99 (2006), like a number of other pieces on view, brings to mind the more abstract work of Henry Moore (1898–1986) or even Barbara Hepworth (1903–1975). But the mirror finish of Wang's rock sculptures gives them a mercurial, shape-shifting look that brings them closer than Moore ever came to the sort of indeterminate form the surrealists wanted. Closer also to the hood ornament look of boastful luxury that Jeff Koons seeks when he casts work in stainless steel. To underline the oddity of these contradictory qualities, and the colliding histories they evoke, Wang has a traditional wooden stand fabricated for each of his table-top rock pieces.

=== My Personal Universe ===
"My Personal Universe" is a 2012 exhibition done by Zhan Wang. The project started in December 2010 and wasn't finished until its revealing in January 2012. The concept that he had for this installation was to try to recreate the beginning of his universe through the explosion of this single rock and about "removing the boundary of time and showcasing power in its most primitive form". Though Wang was the artist behind the project he had help. Many steps were taken to get the end results. The process in which he took resulted in the use of a camera crew of 32, six high-speed cameras that took 2,000 frames per second, an explosion technician, dynamite, one rock, picking up of 7,000 pieces, recreating each piece out of stainless steel, rearranging them in the pattern in which they landed, and the amount of time it took to reassemble "his universe". The cost exceeded $63,000; that alone was the price to rent cameras for the project. However, Louis Vuitton supported the project. In return, he was able to create "My Universe – The Beginning". Video Clip on My Personal Universe

Louis Vuitton Since Louis Vuitton supported Zhang Wang's "My Personal Universe", he was in return able to create a video instillations "My Universe – The Beginning". It was showcased in Beijing for Louis Vuitton's "Louis Vuitton Voyages", a show that helped express their journey and progress as a brand at the National Museum of China.

=== Urban Landscape: Beijing ===
An arrangement of stainless steel cooking ware that has the appearance of Beijing's Landscape. Zhan Wang keeps the forms of the cookware so the viewer can tell that they are still everyday objects. However, through his arrangement he creates conceptual idea of the Urbanization of China and essentially the imagery of Beijing's landscape. As John Stomberg states:

"His materials are both objects of desire and physical manifestations of the systems (social, political, cultural, and economic) in which they operate: it is precisely the trade in commodities such as cooking tools that is fueling the booming Chinese economy, which is in turn driving the modernization of China's cities. In the work there are many of the same cookware, which represents the urban life of Beijing where many of the buildings are identical to one another."

The implications of Urban Landscape: Beijing make the viewer think about this rapid economical modernization that China is under. The amount of detail that Zhan Wang puts in this work is obvious. He even distinguishes between older parts of the cities by adding frost tips. To distinguish the Forbidden City, he uses low serving trays, dishes and groups of lunch boxes that give it a notable look.

=== More works ===
In 2004, Zhan scaled Mount Everest and placed one of his own sculptures at the summit. He created a large outdoor sculpture for The DeYoung Museum in San Francisco that was unveiled in 2005.

For his "On Gold Mountain" exhibition at the Asian Art Museum, located in San Francisco, in 2008, he used rocks selected from the foothills of the Sierra Nevada to create his sculptures, "alluding to the nineteenth-century Chinese immigrant experience of mining gold during the California gold rush. Both the actual rocks and their stainless steel versions will be exhibited", according to the museum. He also created as city-scape of San Francisco using all steel items, such as rocks, mirrored surfaces, silverware, and stainless steel pots and pans.

New Suyuan Rock Manual is a catalogue that showcases all the stainless steel artworks that he has created, both that have been made and also sold. This catalogue is a spin-off of Suyuan shipu that is from 1613; this form of catalogue is an important publication for the rock culture. With his use of scholar rocks he is taking these old Chinese traditions and renewing them so they can fit in the contemporary culture of the new China. The 2006 manual is a printed medium with a steel case (cohesive with his stainless steel scholar rocks). His New Suyuan Rock Manual was showcased in an exhibit with artists who also produced books such as: Xu Bing, Hong Lei, and Lu Shengzhong.

Floating Island of Immortals is a stainless steel artwork in a pond installed at Gibbs Farm, in New Zealand.

== Timeline ==
- 1962 – Born in Beijing China
- 1978–1981 – Beijing Industrial Arts College
- 1983-1988 – Sculptor Department at CAAC
- 1991 – One-artist show CAFA gallery
- 1995; Member of sculptor research
- 2000; Shanghai Biennale
- 2003; Venice Open International Exhibitions of Sculptor and Installation
- 2004; Mount Everest Project
- 2006; Zhang Wang: Urban Landscape
- 2006; Martell Artist of the year
- 2011; Louis Vuitton Voyage
- 2012; My Personal Universe

== Quotes ==
"The best art should be accurate and irreplaceable. I do not regard my works as purely sculptural. I am doing contemporary art." – Zhan Wang

"If I get stuck thinking technically rather than conceptually, my mind will be confined and my advancement hindered." – Zhan Wang

"My art practice was moving at almost the same pace with the changes of urban Beijing," – Zhan Wang

"In China, he says, modernization is associated with the West: when China modernizes, it westernizes." – Zhang Wang
