= Shi Jinsong =

Chinese sculptor (born 1969)

Shi Jinsong (born 1969, Dangyang County Hubei Province, China) is a Chinese artist based in Wuhan and Beijing. He studied at Hubei Institute of Fine Arts in China where he majored in sculpture and mastered an array of traditional styles and techniques. He graduated in 1994.

He is particularly known for his first solo exhibition in the United States at Chambers Fine Art in New York Na Zha Baby Boutique exhibition, a series of stainless steel sculptures depicting baby accessories—rattle, cot, stroller, etc.—made from razor-sharp blades (Na Zha is a child warrior deity in Chinese mythology). He is violent and sly and flamboyantly dressed in flaming trousers with fireball feet. Today, he is associated with lottery, gambling, and the high life and is the star of a cartoon TV show. Shi Jinsong humorously depicts Na Zha in his exhibition as the “new face of Mothercare.” Shi describes Na Zha as “a supernatural youthful hero who always recovers and refuses to grow up. He has three heads, nine eyes and eight arms, with blue clouds coming from his mouth, flamed wheels under his feet, and all kinds of powerful weapons in his hands. He needs only to shout for clouds to turn into rain. He cuts his own flesh and commits suicide to save his father, fights the dragon king, and overturns the universe.” This is the Na Zha portrayed in Shi's artwork. Chambers Fine Art described this work as a "dialogue, at once menacing and ironic, between the forms of mythic Chinese culture and modern day globalization". He returned to this theme for his Secret Book of Cool Weapons, which portrayed corporate logos such as the Nike Swoosh as martial arts weapons.

Shi has shown work internationally in many exhibitions including Shanghai Cool: Creative Reproduction at the Shanghai Duolun Museum of Modern Art, Mahjong at Kunstmuseum Bern in Switzerland, Alors, La Chine? at the Pompidou Center in Paris, and Too Much Flavour at Chambers Fine Art in New York.

== Artistic style ==
Shi's main material is large amounts of stainless steel. This gives his artwork a gleaming, polished, and cold look with razor sharp edges. Shi is known for his childcare products and weaponry. In 2002, his exhibition Secret Book of Cool Weapons transformed common corporate logos into an array of ancient weaponry. Despite his heavy portrayal of machines in his work, Shi is not interested in modern-day machinery. Many details and additions seen on his pieces do not even offer any practical use. Shi adds his own experience and direction to his artwork, giving it a sense of rebellion and contradiction to humanity and morals. This sets his work apart from the typical art of contemporary China. Shi moved out of the explorative stage of form and language, saying that “language is of suspicious nature, especially that with characteristics such as the attractive logo of brands as seen in the commercial market.” The mechanical form depicted in Shi's artwork is a metaphor for real life experience. While Shi's work is not intended to give off a message, he observes social norms and customs with a neutral perspective and then creates a twisted analysis of it. Shi has a very broad mentality, believing that every thing has many surfaces and directions from which to view it. This includes his artistic materials such as steel and charcoal. Shi enjoys exploring different kinds of physical forces, including artificial, natural, and unnamed.

== Influences ==
Three major events had an influence on Shi's life: the radical socio-cultural transformation in China, Foucault’s madness and civilization, and the birth of his first daughter. All of these caused the artist to investigate ideas of transformation and control. Much of Shi’s work is a combination of mythic Chinese culture and modern day globalization.

== Recent works ==
Shi's solo exhibition, Penetrate (2011), was shown at Today Art Museum, Beijing. Penetrate was a large scale sculptural installation curated by art critic Karen Smith. Shi used charcoal, wood, metal, and other materials in his pieces. The giant scale and number of pieces shown in the exhibition as well as the amount of discard involved in the process of replacing new with old and the impact on the environment was all supposed to portray the excesses of modern China. The exhibition was literally a physical mass. Shi collected discarded materials and made them into his own artwork. For example, he took wooden beams from traditional architectural structures and bound them together with old tree trunks, pipes, tubes, and steel joists. The message of this piece was to be more aware of the harm we cause on a daily basis when we recklessly pursue our interests and desires without taking our impact on the environment into consideration.

== Earlier works ==
Shi has been known to break away from his typical steel structures. In 2003, he presented an installation at the Centre Pompidou called A Life of Sugar. The installation was made out of caramel and sugar and designed to melt over the course of the show. The idea of the exhibition was to critique disposable consumer goods.

Shi's Tree Motorcycles (2008) consisted of a tree for the frame and working motorcycle parts on the inside , making them drivable. “I dreamt that a trunk with a big light was running on the road.” Shi Jinsong said in an interview. “I just wanted to know what a big tree – which is four or five meters long – with a speed of more than 100 km per hour looks like.”

Shi also created fancy metallic motorcycles to show in the 2008 Shanghai Biennale. Shi was included in one of the first groups to participate in the exhibition. He created his own humorous logo name, “Ha Ke Long”, for his motorcycles which resemble Harley Davidson’s. The logo was based on the words “halong-kellong” and “tuolaji”, meaning "walking tractor" in Chinese. The motorcycles, carved with symbols of the dragon and phoenix and equipped with karaoke and video instruments, were meant to be driven around the museum by a muscular man dressed as Arnold Schwarzenegger.

== Exhibition history ==
2016

Chinese Whispers, Kunstmuseum Bern, Bern, Switzerland

2011

Penetrate, Today Art Museum, Beijing

2009

Take Off The Armor's Mountain, Space Station Beijing China

Huashan Plan, design courses Shanghai, China

Drama Peach Blossom Prose, Shi Jinsong Studio Beijing China

A Brick Which Crushed Wang Jianguo's Head Bone, ARCO

Madrid International Contemporary Art Fair, Spain

2008

Independent Foot of Crane - Shi's giant free standing foot of a crane made from bronze, along with a similar claw of an eagle, fishbone of a carp, and the tooth of a dog, emphasize the distance between material culture and art through extreme magnification.

Huashan Plan T space, Beijing, China

Fire His Breath Jade His Bones: New Work by Shi Jinsong, Platform China Beijing China

Ne Zha 2008: A Child's Boutique, Chambers Fine Art New York USA

Customize, Marella Gallery Milan Italy

2007

BLUE PRINT-Long Wei international elite school Spring Picnic, Marella Gallery Beijing Beijing China

2006

HALONG-KELLONG New products Launch part Platform, Beijing China

Na Zha-Baby Boutique, Chambers Fine Art, New York USA

2005

Renovation – Relations of Production, Long March, Beijing, China

Second Chengdu Biennale, Chengdu, China

Shanghai Cool: Creative Reproduction, Shanghai Duolun Museum of Modern Art, Shanghai, China

One Beginning Two Ends, He Xiangning Art Museum, Shenzhen, China

Sleight of Mind, TS1 Art Center, Beijing, China

Young Chinese Contemporary Art, Hangar-7, Salzburg, Austria

Case Study: Five Contemporary Chinese Artists, Today Art Museum, Beijing, China

Mahjong, Kunstmuseum Bern, Bern, Switzerland

2003

Too Much Flavour, Chambers Fine Art, New York, USA

Alors, La Chine?, Center Pompidou, Paris, France

Artificial Respiration, Sanhe Art Center, Beijing, China

Open Sky, Shanghai Duolun Museum of Modern Art, Shanghai, China

2002

Run, Jump, Crawl Walk, The East Modern Art Center, Beijing, China

2001

Style of Paris vs. China, Paris, France

Re-Shuffle, Shenzhen Sculpture Academy, Shenzhen, China

2000

The 2nd Exhibition of Chinese Sculptors, Xihu Art Museum, Hangzhou, China

Gig Torino 2000: Biennial of Emerging Artists, Torino, Italy

1999

China 46, HuokeArtGallery, Shanghai, Taipei, and Melboume, Australia

The 2nd Annual Contemporary Sculpture Exhibition, He Xiangning Art Museum, Shenzhen, China
