= Qiu Shihua =

Chinese landscape painter (born 1940 - died 08. 2025)

- Born: 1940 (age 85–86); Zizhong, Sichuan, China
- Education: Xi'an Academy of Fine Art
- Known for: Landscape painting
- Movement: Contemporary art

Qiu Shihua (Chinese: 邱世华; born 1940) is a Chinese landscape painter. He lives and works in Beijing and Shenzhen.

== Life and work ==
Qiu Shihua was born in 1940 in Zizhong, Sichuan, China, and lives and works in Beijing and Shenzhen. He visited France in the 1980s and studied the works of the Impressionists.

His works have been exhibited in shows including the 48th Venice Biennale, the 23rd São Paulo Art Biennial, the Kunsthalle Basel and the Exhibition "Mahjong – Chinesische Gegenwartskunst aus der Sammlung Sigg" which has been shown in Europe and the U.S.A. Qiu Shihua is represented by Galerie Urs Meile, Beijing-Lucerne.

== Publications ==
- Situation Kunst (für Max Imdahl) (Ed.), (2018). scheinbar: nichts. Bildwelten von Qiu Shihua im Dialog / apparently: nothing. Qiu Shihua's Pictorial Worlds in Dialog. Bochum: Stiftung Situation Kunst, 2018.
- Nationalgalerie Berlin, Museum Pfalzgalerie Kaiserslautern (Eds.), (2012). Qiu Shihua. Duesseldorf: Richter & Fey, 2012.
- Kunsthalle Basel (Ed.) (1999). Qui Shi-hua. Basel: Schwabe & Co. AG Verlag.
- Mao, C. W. (Ed.). (2005). Insight. Paintings by Qiu Shihua. New York: Chambers Fine Art.
- Galerie Rudolfinum (Ed.) (2000). Qiu Shi-hua. Landscape Painting. Prague.

== Selected bibliography ==
- Berswordt-Wallrabe, S. von (2018). Endlos, ortlos, schwerelos. Flüchtige Bildwelten von Qiu Shihua / Beyond finiteness, place and gravity. Qiu Shihua's fleeting pictorial worlds. In: scheinbar: nichts / apparently: nothing. exh. cat. Situation Kunst, Bochum (2018), pp. 7–26 and pp. 165–174.
- Berswordt-Wallrabe, S. von (2014). Verflüchtigung und Konkretion. Die Malerei von Qiu Shihua – im Hinblick auf die Bernwardtür. In: Michael Brandt, Gerd Winner (Hrsg.): Übergänge / Transitions. Gotthard Graubner – Bernwardtür – Qiu Shihua, exh. cat. Roemer- und Pelizaeus-Museum Hildesheim, Hildesheim 2014, pp. 48–57.
- Berswordt-Wallrabe, S. von (2012). Between presence and absence. Qiu Shihua's landscape painting. In: Qiu Shihua (Cat. Nationalgalerie Berlin and Museum Pfalzgalerie Kaiserslautern), Düsseldorf: Richter & Fey, pp. 10–45.
- Berswordt-Wallrabe, S. von (2012). At the Threshold of (In-)Visibility. The 'White' Landscape Paintings by Qiu Shihua. In: Birgit Hopfener, Franziska Koch, Jeong-hee Lee-Kalisch, Juliane Noth (Eds.): Negotiating Difference. Contemporary Chinese Art in the Global Context (documenting an international conference held at Freie Universität Berlin/Haus der Kulturen der Welt, 2009), Weimar 2012, pp. 87–97.
- Berswordt-Wallrabe, S. von (2010). Qiu Shihua. In: Weltsichten. Landschaft in der Kunst seit dem 17. Jahrhundert (Catalogue Situation Kunst Bochum, Kunsthalle zu Kiel, Museum Wiesbaden, Kunstsammlungen Chemnitz, Bonnefantenmuseum Maastricht). Cologne: Wienand Verlag. pp. 260–262, 327.
- Gerlach, P. (2007). Qiu Shihua. In: Idylle. Traum und Trugschluss Idyll. Illusion and Delusion (Catalogue, Zybok, O. Ed.). Ostfildern: Hatje Cantz Verlag. pp. 204–207.
- Rasche, S. (2007). White Out – Künstlerische Expeditionen in ungesicherte Bereiche. In: White Out (Catalogue). Bregenz: Berufsvereinigung Bildender Künstlerinnen und Künstler Vorarlberg. pp. 34–36, 75.
- Tinari, P. (2007). Qiu Shihua. In: China Art Book. The 80 most renowned Chinese artists. Cologne: DuMont Buchverlag. pp. 296–303.
- Köppel-Yang, M. (1999). Qiu Shi-hua. Geschmack an der Fadheit. In: Qui Shi-hua (Kunsthalle Basel, Ed.). Basel: Schwabe & Co. AG Verlag.
- Tancock, J. (2005). Qiu Shi-hua. In: Insight. Paintings by Qiu Shihua (Catalogue, Mao, C. W., Ed.). New York: Chambers Fine Art.
- Lai Chi-Tim (2000). The Nature of the Dao. In: Qiu Shi-hua. Landscape Painting. Prague: Galerie Rudolfinum. pp. 7–9.
- Yan Shanchun (2000). 'Landscape' Painting in the Eyes of the Chinese. In: Qiu Shi-hua. Landscape Painting. Prague: Galerie Rudolfinum. pp. 11–21.
- Chang Tsong-zung (2000). The Sky in the Landscape. In: Qiu Shi-hua. Landscape Painting. Prague: Galerie Rudolfinum. pp. 23–30.
- Wechsler, M. (1999). Malerei am äussersten Rand. Langsamkeit der Malerei. In extremis. In: Qui Shi-hua (Kunsthalle Basel, Ed.). Basel: Schwabe & Co. AG Verlag.

== Exhibitions ==
=== Solo exhibitions ===
- 2018/19 Situation Kunst (für Max Imdahl), Kunstsammlungen der Ruhr-Universität Bochum, Bochum, Germany
- 2012/13 Museum Pfalzgalerie Kaiserslautern, Germany
- 2012 Nationalgalerie im Hamburger Bahnhof Berlin, Germany
- 2005 Galerie Urs Meile, Lucerne, Switzerland

Insight: Paintings by Qiu Shihua, Chambers Fine Art, New York, NY, US

- 2004 Qiu Shihua, Künstlerverein Malkasten, Düsseldorf, Germany
- 2002 White Landscape, Pruss & Ochs Gallery, Berlin, Germany
- 2001 Landscape – Painting on the Edge of Visibility, Galleria OTSO, Espoo, Finland
- 2000 Qiu Shihua – Landscape Painting, Rudolfinum, Prague, Czech Republic
- 1999 Qiu Shihua, Kunsthalle Basel, Basel, Switzerland
- 1997 Qiu Shihua, Hanart TZ Gallery, Hong Kong, Taiwan, China
- 1995 Qiu Shihua, Hanart TZ Gallery, Hong Kong, China
- 1991 Qiu Shihua, Hanart TZ Gallery, Hong Kong, Taiwan, China
- 1990 Qiu Shihua, Alliance Française, Hong Kong, China

=== Group exhibitions ===
- 2010 "Weltsichten. Landschaft in der Kunst seit dem 17. Jahrhundert"; Situation Kunst (für Max Imdahl), Bochum; travelled to: Kunsthalle zu Kiel (2011), Museum Wiesbaden (2011), Kunstsammlungen Chemnitz (2012), Museum Dieselkraftwerk Cottbus (2012/13), Bonnefantenmuseum Maastricht (2014), Weserburg Bremen (2015), Kunsthalle Rostock (2015)
- 2008 Qi Yun, ChinaSquare, New York
- 2007 "Mahjong - Chinesische Gegenwartskunst aus der Sammlung Sigg", Museum der Moderne, Salzburg, Austria
- Qi Yun – - "Qi Yun – the international traveling exhibition of Chinese abstractart", OCT contemporary art terminal of He Xiangnin museum, Shenzhen, China
- "Art from China – Collection Uli Sigg", Centro Cultural Banco do Brasil, Rio de Janeiro, Brazil
- "The Year of the Golden Pig – Contemporary Chinese Art from the Sigg Collection", Lewis Glucksman Gallery, University College, Cork, Ireland
- "White Out", Künstlerhaus Palais Thurn und Taxis, Bregenz, Austria / Stadtgalerie Saarbrücken, Saarbrücken, Germany
- "The Sublime is Now", Museum Franz Gertsch, Burgdorf, Switzerland
- 2006 "Mahjong - Chinesische Gegenwartskunst aus der Sammlung Sigg”, Hamburger Kunsthalle, Hamburg, Germany
- 2005 “PICTORIAL DNA made in China”, Galerie Urs Meile, Lucerne, Switzerland
- "Mahjong - Chinesische Gegenwartskunst aus der Sammlung Sigg“, Kunstmuseum Bern, Bern, Switzerland
- "CHINA: as seen BY CONTEMPORARY CHINESE ARTISTS", Provincia di Milano, Spazio Oberdan, Italy
- 2004 Shanghai Biennale, Shanghai, China
- Le Printemps de Chine", CRAC Alsace, France
- 2003 New Zone – Chinese Art, Zacheta National Gallery of Art, Warsaw, Poland
- Einbildung – Das Wahmehmen in der Kunst, Kunsthaus Graz, Austria
- 2002 China – Tradition und Moderne, Ludwig Galerie Schloss Oberhausen, Germany
- Welcome China !, Gallery Soardi, Nice, France
- 2001 The Inward Eye: Transcendence in Contemporary Art, Contemporary Art Museum, Houston, Texas, US
- 2nd Berlin Biennale, Berlin, Germany
- 2000 Our Chinese Friends, ACC Gallery Weimar & Galerie the Bauhaus University, Weimar, Germany
- 1999 d'APERTutto, 48th La Biennale di Venezia, Venice, Italy
- Natural Reality, Forum Ludwig, Aachen, Germany
- 1998 Eight Chinese Artists, Asian Fine Art Gallery, Berlin, Germany
- 1996 China, Bonn, Vienna, Singapore, Copenhagen, Warsaw, Berlin, Germany
- 23rd International Biennale, São Paulo, Brazil (As a special guest)
- Haus der Kulturen der Welt, Berlin, Germany
- 1995 China's New Art Post-1989, US
- 1992 The First Annual Exhibition of Chinese Oil Painting, Hong Kong, China
- 1986 Chinese Art Festival, organized by La Défense in Paris, France
