= Hendrik Nicolaas Werkman =

Dutch artist, typographer and printer

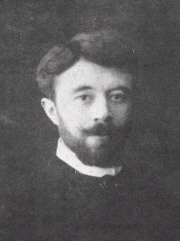
- H. N. Werkman in c. 1906
- Born: 29 April 1882; Leens, Netherlands
- Died: 10 April 1945 (aged 62); Bakkeveen, Netherlands
- Known for: Typography, graphic design

Hendrik Nicolaas Werkman (commonly called H. N. Werkman; 29 April 1882 – 10 April 1945) was an experimental Dutch artist, typographer, and printer. He set up a clandestine printing house during the Nazi occupation (1940–1945) and was shot by the Gestapo in the closing days of the war.

== Life and work ==
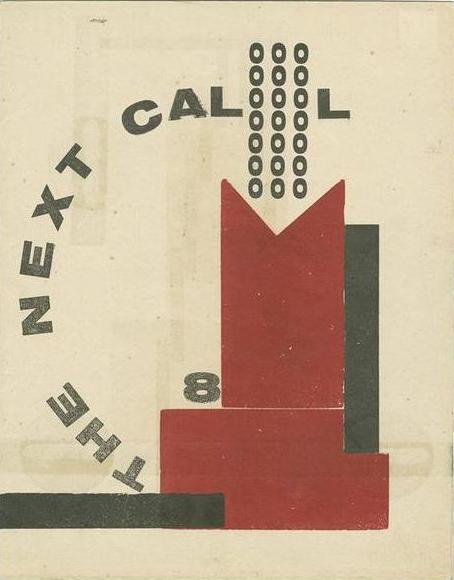
Werkman's magazine The Next Call, a cover designed by him in 1926

Werkman was born on 29 April 1882 in Leens, in the province of Groningen. He was the son of a veterinary surgeon who died while he was young, after which his mother moved the family to the city of Groningen. In 1908, he established a printing and publishing house there that at its peak employed some twenty workers. Financial setbacks forced its closure in 1923, after which Werkman started anew with a small workshop in the attic of a warehouse.

Werkman was a member of the artists' group De Ploeg ("The Plough"), for whom he printed posters, invitations and catalogues. From 1923 to 1926, he produced his own English-named avant-garde magazine The Next Call, which, like other works of the period, included collage-like experimentation with typefaces, printing blocks and other printers' materials. He would distribute the magazine by exchanging it for works by other avant-garde artists and designers abroad and so kept in touch with progressive trends in European art. Among the most fruitful contacts were with Theo van Doesburg, Kurt Schwitters, El Lissitzky and Michel Seuphor, the last of whom exhibited a print of his in Paris. This exchange would prove very fruitful, as foreign magazines served as a source of inspiration for Werkman – as he himself admitted, even though he did not always understand the contents, Werkman searched for new ideas on the pages of the magazines he received.

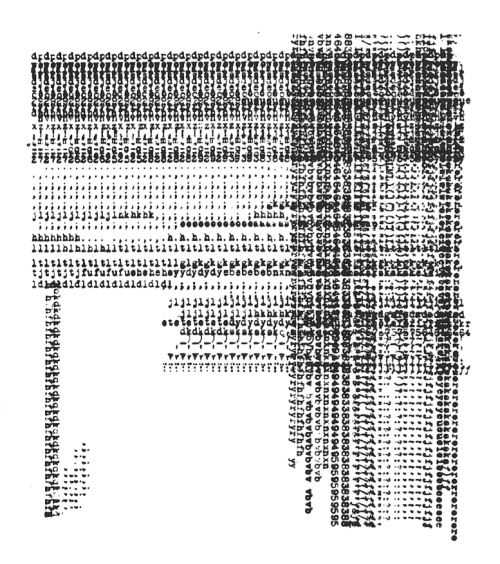
A 'typestract' by H.N. Werkman, 1923–9

Such contact was vital while Werkman was building up his business and could not leave Groningen. In 1929 he was able to visit Cologne and Paris, after which he developed a new printing method, applying the ink roller directly to the paper and then stamping to achieve unique effects on a simple handpress. The more complex of these required some fifty handlings in and out of the press and could take a whole day to complete. Another of his experimental techniques was the painstaking production of abstract designs using the typewriter, which he called tiksels. After 1929 he also began writing rhythmic sound poems.

Werkman's work was included in the 1939 exhibition and sale Onze Kunst van Heden (Our Art of Today) at the Rijksmuseum in Amsterdam.

In May 1940, soon after the German invasion of the Netherlands, Werkman started a clandestine publishing house, De Blauwe Schuit ("The Blue Barge"), which ran to forty publications, all designed and illustrated by Werkman. Included there were a series of Hassidic stories from the legend of the Baal Shem Tov. On 13 March 1945, the Gestapo arrested Werkman, executing him by firing squad along with nine other prisoners in the forest near Bakkeveen on 10 April, six days before Groningen was liberated. Many of his paintings and prints, which the Gestapo had confiscated, were lost in the fire that broke out during the battle over the city.

== Heritage ==
Werkman is buried in the Bakkeveen cemetery. There is now a monument commemorating the ten who were shot then, and another to him at the village where he was born. In 1992 the Dutch director Gerrard Verhage filmed an hour-long dramatized documentary about Werkman's last days, Ik ga naar Tahiti, (I’m going to Tahiti, 1992).

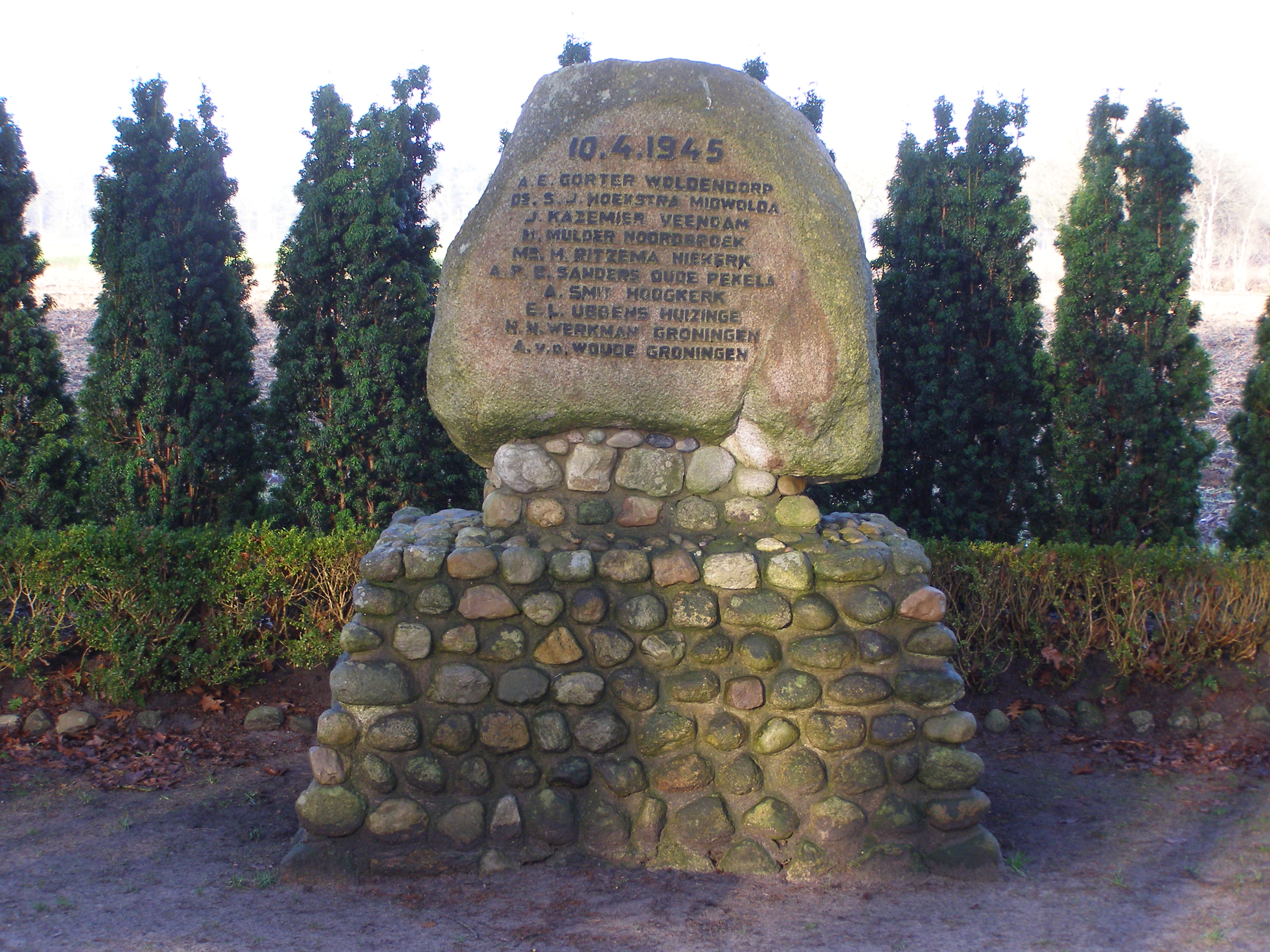
The Bakkeveen monument

Just before World War II the museum director Willem Sandberg, who was originally trained as a typographer, had paid Werkman a visit and even arranged for him a small solo exhibition in Amsterdam in 1939. Immediately after the war he put on a retrospective at the Stedelijk Museum and laid the foundation for its large collection of Werkman's work. He also wrote a tribute to his friend, “a man with a craving for freedom manifest in his way of life, expressed in his work, who became an artist at the moment he was economically broken, deserted by everybody, considered a freak – at that moment he created a world of his own, warm, vivid and vital.” A later tribute to his example was paid in an American monograph devoted to his work: “Since Werkman’s death an awareness of his relevance to contemporary graphic design has steadily emerged, and his work has lost nothing of its richness, spirit and optimism.”

In 1983 Werkman’s former warehouse premises were converted into workshops and the building was then named after him. In the city museum's graphic department there is a workshop displaying his printing equipment. In 1999 the H.N. Werkman Foundation was set up to promote awareness of his work and its large collection of prints, drawings, paintings and letters was transferred on permanent loan to the Groninger Museum.

One of the main municipal secondary schools in the city was later named the H.N. Werkman College after him and keeps his heritage alive in its art classes and recurring special projects.

== Gallery of works ==
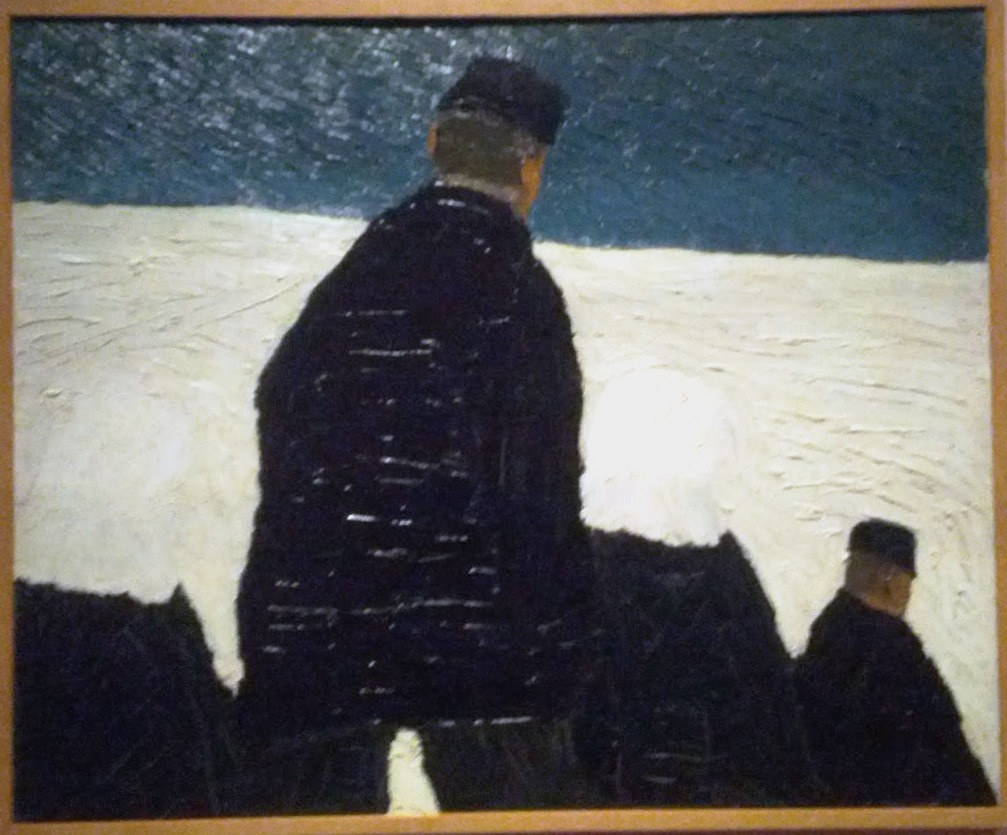
Church-going in the Snow, oil on canvas 1919

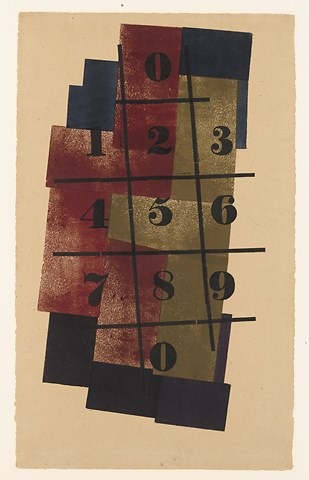
Composition with numbers, 1924, print, Stedelijk Museum Amsterdam

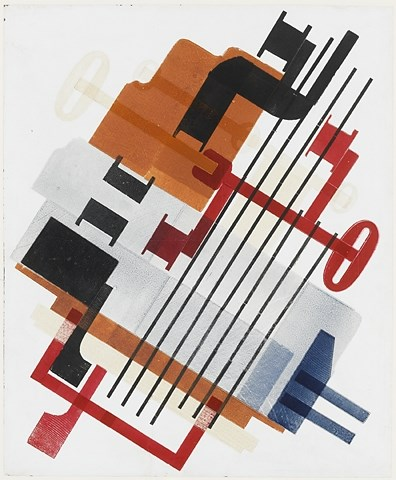
Composition, 1925, print, Stedelijk Museum Amsterdam

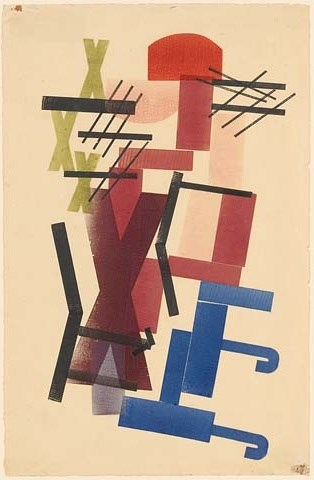
Composition with letters X, 1927, print, Stedelijk Museum Amsterdam

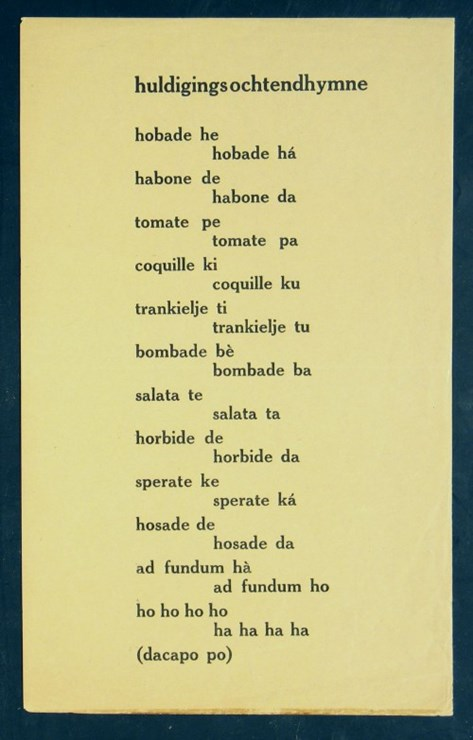
Morning hymn of homage, 1936, sound-poem

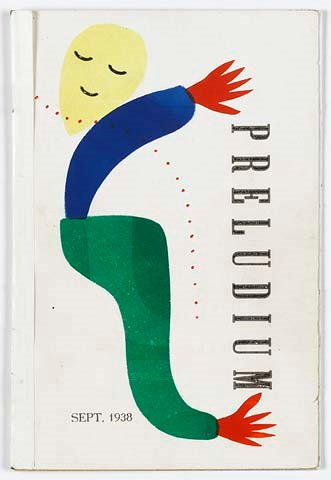
Preludium, 1938, magazine cover

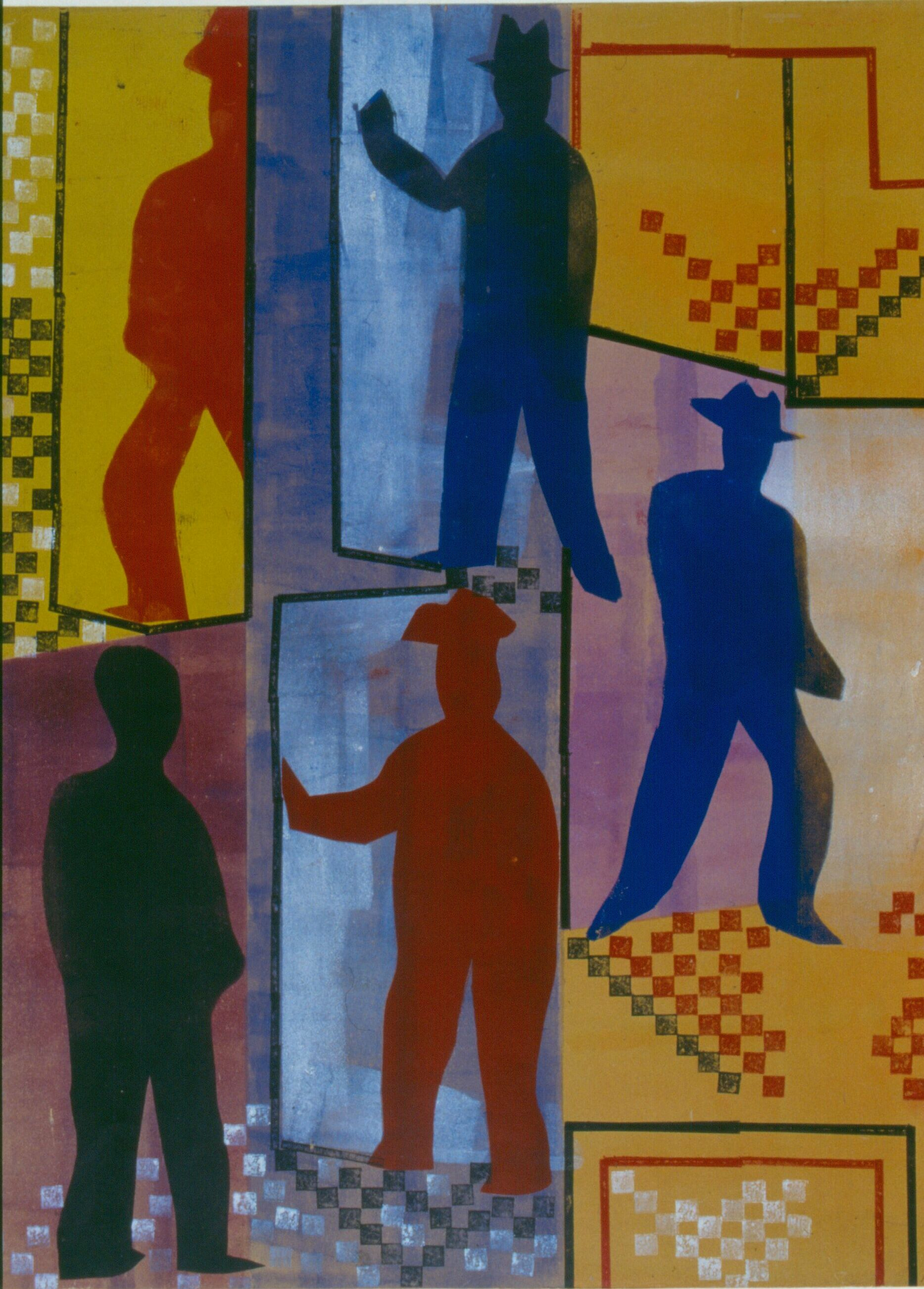
Revolving door of the post office 2., 1941; template and stamp on paper

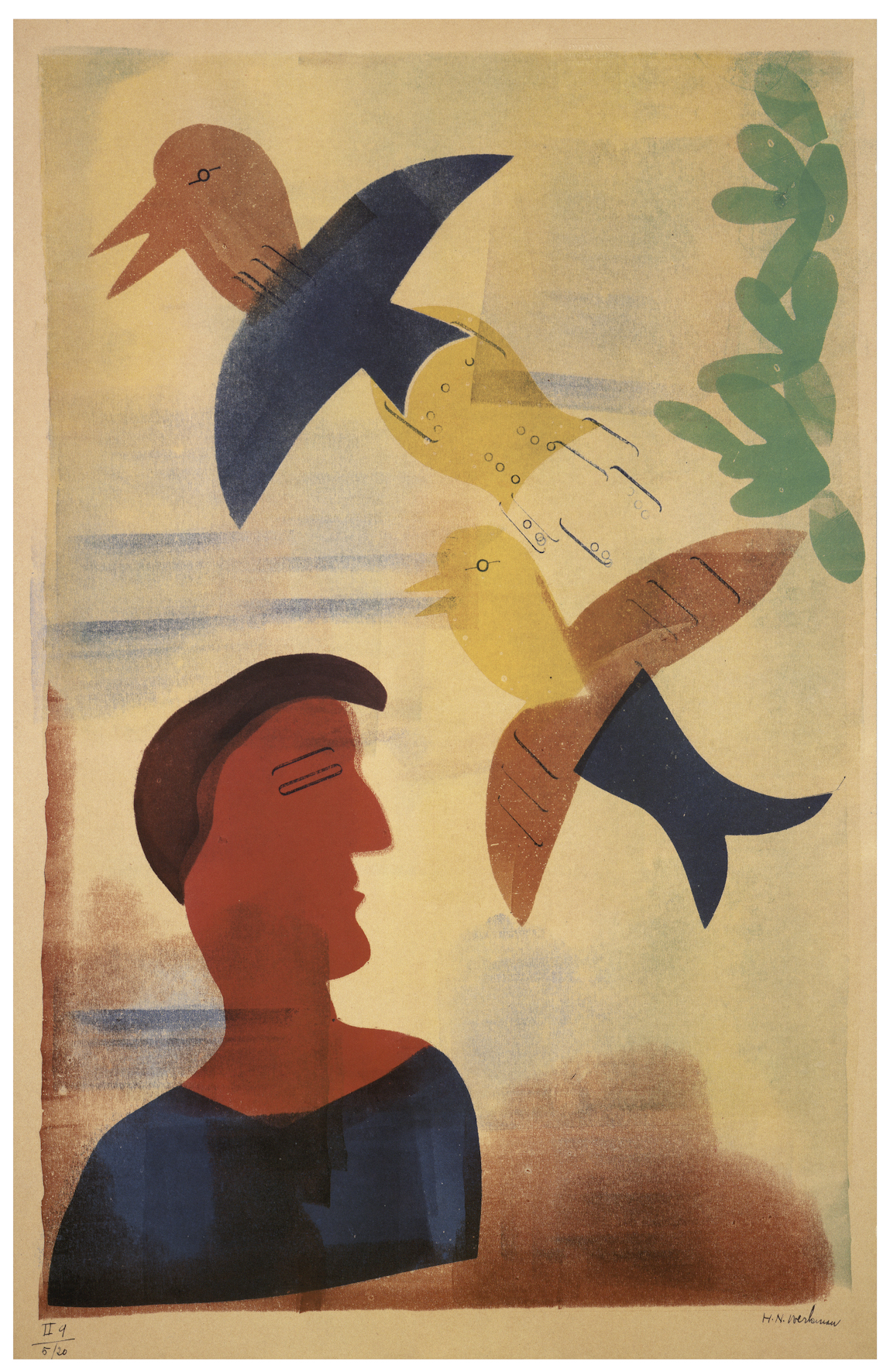
Hasidic legends (Chassidisiche legenden), 1942, print

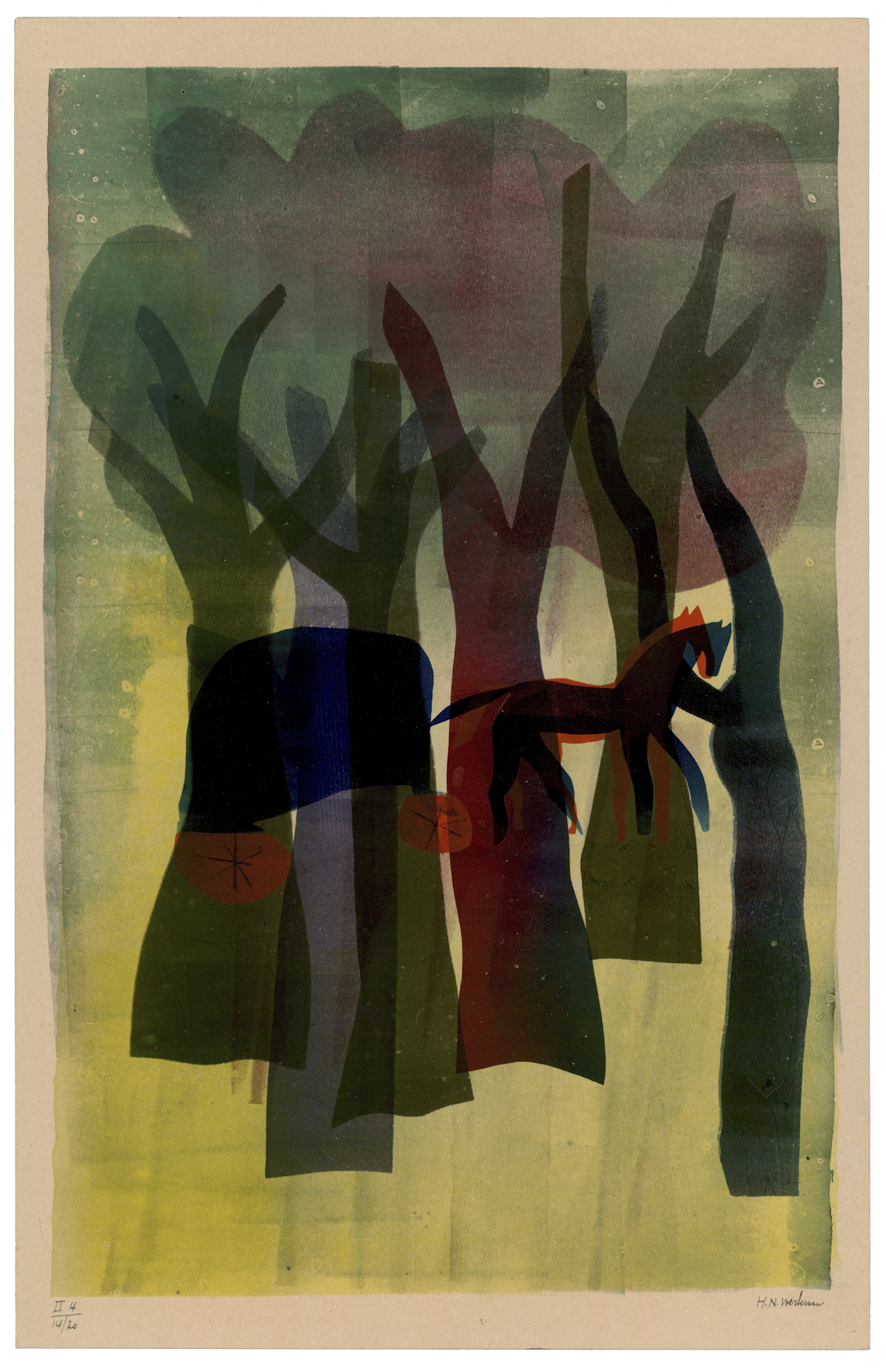
Hasidic legends (Chassidisiche legenden), 1942, print

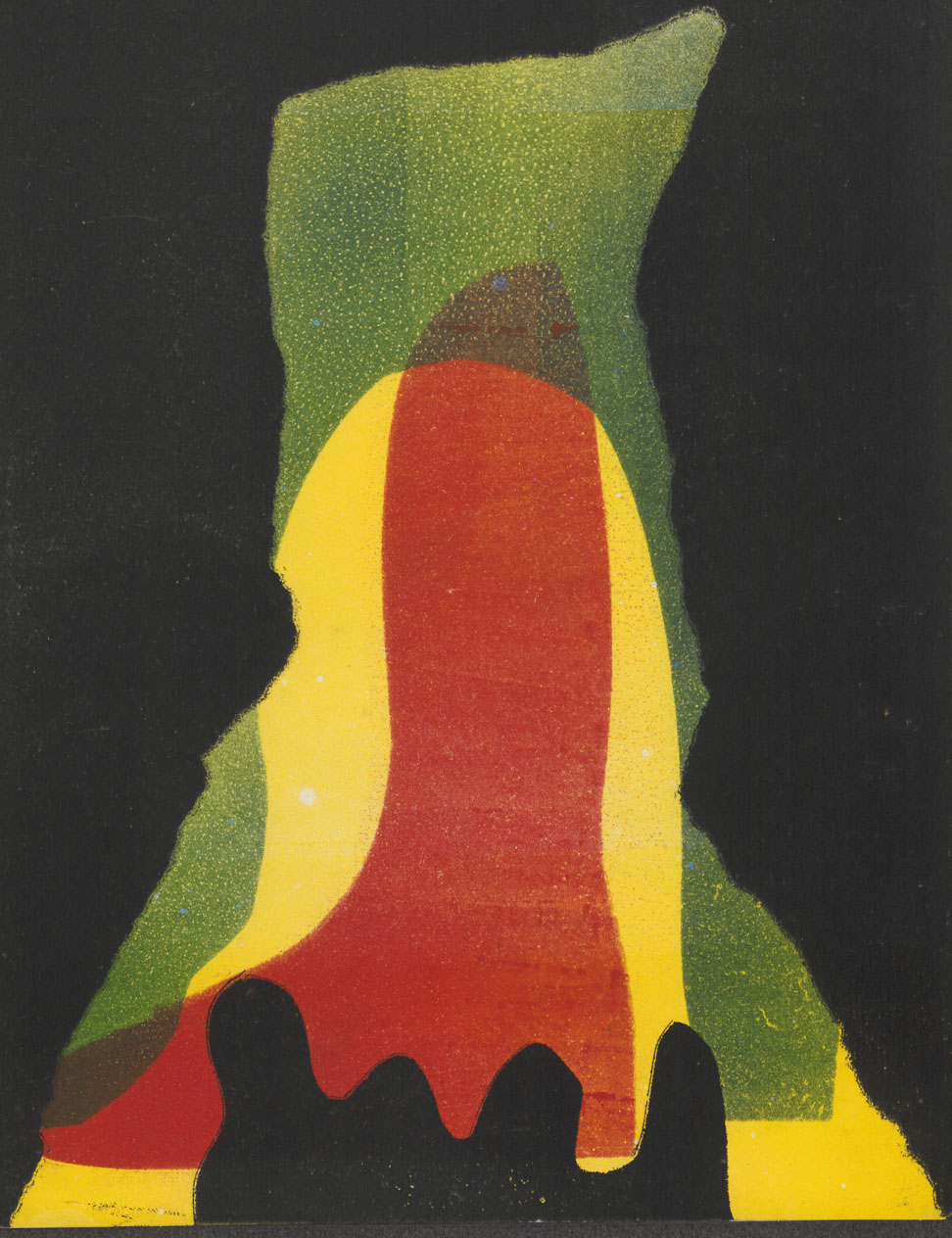
The Cave (De Grot), 1943; cover-design
