= Lü Shengzhong =

Chinese artist (1952-2022)

Lü Shengzhong (Chinese: 吕胜中; 1952-2022) was a Chinese artist who specialized in the Chinese art of paper cutting.

He came of age during the turbulent Cultural Revolution. When China started to open up following the death of Mao Zedong in 1976, Lü Shengzhong turned to traditional Chinese folk arts, unlike his contemporaries who embraced contemporary art forms practiced in the West, such as installation art, oil paintings and performance art.

== Early life ==
Lü Shengzong was born in 1952 in Shandong, China. Shandong has long been known for its paper cutting art culture. Lü's father was a farmer where his mother was a house-wife, who was well known around the village for her paper cutting talents. Lü's mother's talent greatly impressed him as a child.

Before his career in art, Lü served in the army, where he worked as a communications officer and a film projectionist. In 1976, he attended art school at Shandong Normal University, and graduated in 1978 with a degree in Fine Arts. After graduation he later attended Central Academy of Fine Arts (CAFA) in Beijing for his masters program in the early 1980s.

Lü's studies coincided with the end of the Cultural Revolution, as China's art scene began a change from socialist realist paintings to art styles with more Western influences. Lü classmates began to discover rock & roll music, blue jeans, jazz, as well as Dadaism. However, Lü instead chose to travel through China's hinterland during his masters. In the northern Shaanxi province upon the Loess Plateau, a rough area that's known for its arid terrain and the poverty, Lü observed the local peasant women create out of paper various shapes and objects like pomegranates and rabbits.

Lü Shengzhong graduated from Central Academy of Fine Art in 1987, with a masters in folk art.

== Career ==
In 1988, Lü hosted his first major exhibition at the National Art Museum of China. He filled the art gallery with densely-placed cutout figures, including footprints suspended in mid-air. The centerpiece of the exhibition, Xing (Chinese: 《彳亍》), was a cave-like emplacement inspired by the Yaodong dwellings common in the Loess Plateau. This cave-like style became a hallmark of Lü's art style, which surrounded the viewer and 'mobilized all sensory organs'.

Lü's work started garnering international attention in the 1990s. His signature character is the 'Little Red Figure', a silhouette that resembles a little child stemming from a rural Chinese tradition that the little child can remove misfortunes. In multiple international exhibitions, the figure was adapted into a wide range of objects including targets in a shooting range, figures on Stained glass, and patients in hospital beds.

The 2000s marked another turning point in Lü's style. In the Reading Room of Mountain and Water (Chinese: 《山水书房》) in 2003, the details of the pieces were mostly confined to the books in the walls, unlike his earlier works where the pieces were more three-dimensional. He also pivoted into teaching; he stated that 'the teaching of experimental art is more meaningful than a handful of artworks and exhibitions', and that compared to the traditional arts of carving and painting, experimental arts focused more on creating new space in the modern art world.

Lü retired in 2016, but his creation continued in the form of Moments on WeChat, where he posted daily snapshots of him leaping into the sky. These photos were noted for their commonalities with the 'Little Red Figures' as Lü stretched out his extremeties in a manner reminiscent of the figures.

On 26 October, 2022, Lü died at the age of 70.

== Selected works ==
=== Exhibitions ===
- 1989: Life-Ephemeral and Eternal, Taipei, Taiwan
- 1989: China Avant-Garde, NAGC, Beijing
- 1990: Calling the Soul Hall, Central Academy of Fine Arts Gallery, Beijing
- 1990–1992: Calling the Soul Around, Beijing, Hebei, Shanxi, Hunan, Guanxi, and Liaoning provinces
- 1991: Calling the Soul, Museum of Contemporary Art, Beijing
- 1992: Red Train, Emden, Berlin, Wiesbaden, and Hamburg, Germany
- 1992: Begenung Mit Den Anderen, Halle K18, Gesanthochschole, Kassel, Germany
- 1992-1993: Post-Mao Product, New Art from China, traveling exhibition in Australia
- 1994: Asian Art Show, Fukuoka Art Museum, Japan
- 1994: Soul Stele, Adelaide, Australia
- 1994: Soul Market, Beck Forum, Munich, Germany
- 1994: Emergency Center, St. Petersburg, Russia
- 1995: ORT -+, Wuppertal, Germany
- 1995: International Biennial Art Show, Gwangju, Korea
- 1995: 4th Asian Art Show (Realism as an Attitude), Setagaya Art Museum, Japan
- 1996: ARCOS DA LAPA, Rio de Janeiro, Brazil
- 1996: Origin and Myths of Fire, The Museum of Modern Art, Saitama, Japan
- 1996: Calling the Soul, Fukuoka Art Museum, Japan
- 1998: Notes Across Asia, Berlin, Germany
- 1998: Recalling Tradition, German Embassy, Beijing
- 2000: First Encounter, Chambers Fine Art, New York, USA
- 2000: Record of Emotion, the Watchtower-Contemporary Art, Beijing
- 2000: Gate of the Century (1979–1999) Chinese Art Invitational Exhibition, The Contemporary Art Museum, Chengdu
- 2001: Lü Shengzhong: World!, Fukuoka Art Museum, Fukuoka, Japan
- 2001: Beijing-Dachauer, Dachauer Schloss, Germany
- 2001: CLües to the Future, Red Gate Gallery, Beijing, China
- 2002: A la nuit tombée: Lü Shengzhong, Grenoble, France
- 2002: De Waan Venray AsyLüm, the Netherlands
- 2003: Auspice From Above, Eslite Gallery, Taipei, Taiwan
- 2003: Guangzhou Triennial, Guangzhou Museum of Fine Art, Guangzhou, China BLüe Sky Exposure, Yizhuang, Beijing, China
- 2003: Synthi-Scapes: Chinese Pavilion of the 50th Venice Biennale, (cancelled due to SARS), later shown in Guangzhou Museum of Fine Art, Guangzhou, China
- 2003: Openness, China Art Museum, Beijing, China
- 2003: Left Hand, Right Hand, 798 Art Space, Beijing, China
- 2004: The Book of Humanity, Chambers Fine Art, New York, USA
- 2004: Cinesi artisti fra tradizione e presente, Marsilio Art Museum, Italy
- 2004: Universal Figure—A. R. Penck and Lü Shengzhong, White Space Gallery, Beijing, China
- 2005: The New Emerging From the Old, University Art Museum, University at Albany, New York, USA
- 2007: Square Earth, Round Heaven, Chambers Fine Art, New York, USA

=== Publications ===
- 1990: Works of Shenzhong, Lü, Hunan Art Publication Press
- 1992: Folk Paper-cut, Hunan Art Publication Press
- 1992: Huazhou Shadow Figures, Hunan Art Publication Press
- 1994: Chinese Folk Wood Engraving, Hunan Art Publication Press
- 1994: Selection of Line Drawing of Lü Shengzhong, Guangxi Fine Arts Publication House Press
- 1995: Seeking the Soul, Hunan Art Publication Press
- 1996: The Classic Appreciation of Folk Paper-cut, China Films Press
- 1998: Lü Shengzhong: Calling the Soul, Guangxi Fine Arts Publication House Press
- 2000: Drafting Characters, China Youth Publication Press
- 2000: The First Meet, New York Chambers Fine Art Press
- 2001: Walking and Observing, SDX San Lian Bookstore Publishing
- 2001: Flourmade tiger of Langzhuang (collaborate with Li, Hongjun), Taiwan Echo Publishing Press
- 2002: Colored Clothes, Guangxi Fine Arts Publication House Press
- 2002: Baby's GalLüs, Guangxi Fine Arts Publication House Press
- 2003: Original Manuscript of Molding, SDX San Lian Bookstore Publishing
- 2003: Farewell Tradition I, SDX San Lian Bookstore Publishing
- 2003: Farewell Tradition II, SDX San Lian Bookstore Publishing
- 2003: The Arrival of Lück, Taiwan Eslite Gallery Press
- 2003: The Story of Little Red Kid, Shanghai Literature and Art Publishing Press
- 2004: Farewell Tradition III, SDX San Lian Bookstore Publishing
- 2004: Farewell Tradition IV, SDX San Lian Bookstore Publishing

=== Stamp Designs ===
- 1988: Countryside Culture (4 pieces of memorial), China Post
- 1988: Chinese Agricultural Sports Conference (2 pieces of memorial), China Post
- 1989: She Han Ling Zhi, Safety with all Seasons (stamp with the animal of Chinese Birth year), China Post
- 1996: Xi Jian Guang Ming, The Myriad of Lights (stamp with the animal of Chinese Birth year 2 pieces of memorial), China Post
- 2005: Rooster Crows (stamp with the animal of Chinese Birth year), China Post
- 2006: Guo Tai Min An (stamp with the animal of Chinese Birth year), China Post
