= H.N. Werkman College =

Coordinates: 53.2201°N 6.5729°E

Logo of the H.N. Werkman College

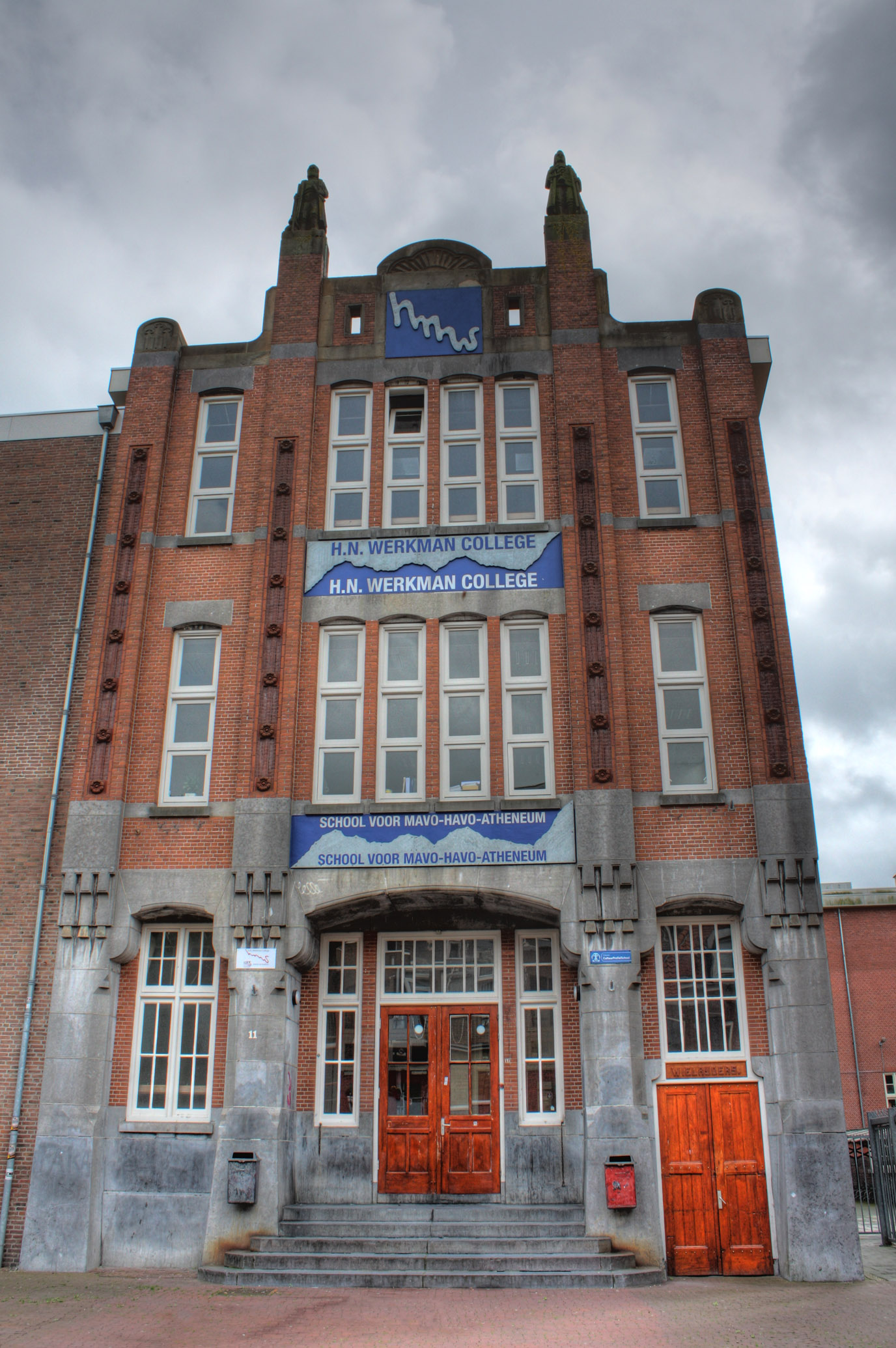
The front of the main building of the H.N. Werkman College

H.N. Werkman College is a Dutch High School in the city of Groningen. The school is named after the Dutch artist, typographer and printer Hendrik Nicolaas Werkman. The school is divided over four buildings: Stadslyceum, Dalton, Kluiverboom and Vinkenstraat. In 2006 the school had 1352 students and 130 employees. The current rector of the H.N. Werkmancollege is C. Japenga.

The school in the city centre offers the streams havo, vwo and Lyceum (which offers students Latin as an extra subject). It also has a Technasium department. Werkman vmbo only offers the stream vmbo.

== History ==
The building at the Sint-Jansstraat was originally a department of the Heymans Lyceum. When the Heymans Lyceum merged with the Röling College in 1980, it offered havo and vwo. In the building at the Schoolstraat the Van Randwijck mavo was located.Following a merger of the Van Randwijck Mavo and the Thorbecke College, the school was renamed to H.N. Werkmancollege in 1986. Since a merger with the Röling College in August 2010, Werkman College has four departments. As of 2014 it consists of Dalton for sport talents and the first two years of vmbo, Stadslyceum (Centrum before 2014) for havo and VWO, Kluiverboom for the last 2 years of vmbo, and the ISK for immigrants who will move on to other schools after they have learned the language and have integrated.
