= Jeong-hee Lee-Kalisch =

South Korean art historian

Jeong-hee Lee-Kalisch (born 1955) is a South Korean art historian specialising in Chinese painting and archaeology, Korean art, Buddhist art and East Asian ceramics. From 2003 to 2021 she was the professor of East Asian Art History in the Art History Institute (Department of History and Culture) at the Free University Berlin.

== Biography ==
Before going to Germany to study art history, sinology and Japanese studies at the University of Cologne, Jeong-hee Lee-Kalisch received her Bachelor of Fine Art in South Korea. In 1987 she completed her M.A. Thesis titled "The Four Delights of Nan Shenglu; An Enquiry into Chinese Figure Painting, Using the Example of a Scroll by Chen Hongshou, from the Charles A. Drenowatz collection in the Rietberg Museum, Zürich". Upon completion of her master's degree, she began working as a research assistant to Prof. Dr. Roger Goepper in the Asia Department of the Art History Institute of Cologne University and, in 1989, worked as a curator at the Museum for East Asian Art in Cologne. Subsequently, Lee-Kalisch completed her doctorate (Dr. Phil.) at the University of Cologne. There she wrote her dissertation, titled ""The Lustre of Nobility (junzi zhi guang). The moon in Chinese landscape painting" which was published in 2001 as part of the Monumenta Serica Monography Series.

From 1995–2000, she was the head curator of the exhibition "Korea – The Ancient Kingdoms" (Korea, die Alten Königreiche) financed by the Kulturstiftung Ruhr in Essen. This marked the first time that Korean art, ranging from the Bronze Age to the end of the Joseon Dynasty (1392–1910), was introduced to Europe in a distinguished exhibition, allowing it to be seen independent of China and Japan as its own distinctive East Asian art tradition.

In 2003, whilst working as head curator of the exhibition "Tibet – Treasures from Tibetan Monasteries" (Tibet, Klöster öffnen ihre Schatzkammern) financed by the Kulturstiftung Ruhr in Essen, Lee-Kalisch was appointed to the professorship for East Asian Art History in the Art History Institute (Department of History and Culture) at the Free University Berlin. In her teaching and research she has specialised in various fields such as Buddhist art, garden art, East Asian painting and art of the Silk Road. During her professorship she initiated numerous research projects, including the joint research project "Silk Road Fashion", funded by the German Federal Ministry of Education and Research (BMBF)

== Selected publications ==
- Ritual and Representation in Buddhist Art (Editor with Antje Papist-Matsuo and Author), Studies of East Asian art history / Studien zur ostasiatischen Kunstgeschichte, Vol./Band 2. Weimar: VDG 2015 (ISBN 978-3-89739-641-8)
- Tibet: Klöster öffnen ihre Schatzkammern (Editor and Co-Author with Andreas Kretschmar etc.). Exhibition catalogue, München: Hirmer 2006 (ISBN 978-3-7774-3115-4)
- Korea - Das Land der Morgenstille (Author). München: Hirmer 2002 (ISBN 3-7774-9350-3)
- Korea – Die Alten Königreiche (Editor and Author with Roger Goepper). Exhibition catalogue, München: Hirmer 1999 (ISBN 3-7774-8220-X)
- Das Alte China: Menschen und Götter im Reich der Mitte (Editor and Author with Roger Goepper and Peter Wiederhage). Exhibition catalogue, München: Hirmer 1995 (ISBN 3-7774-6640-9)
