= Jan Altink =

Dutch painter (1885–1971)

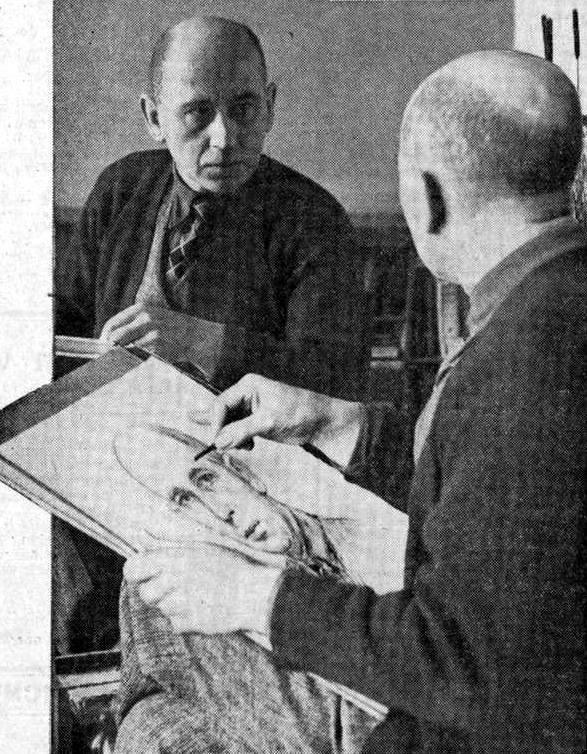
- Jan Altink, 1935
- Born: 21 October 1885; Groningen, Netherlands
- Died: 6 December 1971 (aged 86); Groningen, Netherlands
- Education: Academie Minerva
- Movement: De Ploeg

Jan Altink (Dutch pronunciation: [jɑn ˈɑltɪŋk]; 21 October 1885 – 6 December 1971) was a Dutch expressionist painter and cofounder of De Ploeg.

== Life ==
Jan Altink was born on 21 October 1885 in Groningen in the Netherlands.

He studied at the Kunstnijverheidsschool (circa 1900) and Academie Minerva (circa 1911). In 1918, he was a cofounder of the artists' association and movement De Ploeg. It was named in reference to breaking new ground.

Altink's work was included in the 1939 exhibition and sale Onze Kunst van Heden (Our Art of Today) at the Rijksmuseum in Amsterdam.

Altink died, at the age of 86, in the city of Groningen on 6 December 1971.

== Work ==
Auction house Christie's described Altink as being "widely regarded as the purest 'Groninger' of all Ploeg artists".

After studying paintings alleged to be the work of Altink, Dutch art expert Milko den Leeuw testified in a forgery case that the pictological “handwriting” of some works that had been contributed to him did not match his other paintings, but were a perfect match for those produced by an accused forger, the Dutch painter and art collector Cor van Loenen, under his own name.
