= Chi Peng =

Chinese-born artist

- 迟鹏
- Born: 1981 (age 43–44); Yantai, Shandong Province, China

Chi Peng (Chinese: 迟鹏; born 1981) is a Chinese-born artist who lives and works in Beijing, China.

Born in Yantai, Shandong Province, China in 1981, he entered the Central Academy of Fine Arts (CAFA) in 2001, and graduated from the Digital Media Department, Central Academy of Fine Arts (CAFA) in 2005.

== Biography ==
Chi Peng graduated from the Central Academy of Fine Art in Beijing, with Photography as his main subject, in 2005. During his study he was selected by curator Feng Boyi, who is also co-curator of this exhibition, for an exhibition abroad. Three years later, Chi Peng is one of the most-requested Chinese artists for photographic exhibitions all over the world.

== Solo exhibitions ==
2012

- Trading Pain 2012, Ludwig Museum, Budapest, Hungary Chi Peng | Mood and Memory, Street Level Photoworks, Glasgow, Scotland

2011

- Me, Myself, and I, Photoworks 2003–2010, Groninger Museum, Groningen, Netherlands
- Mood and Memory, M97 Gallery, Shang Hai, China

2010

- Chi Peng / Mood Is Hard to Remember, Today Art Museum, Beijing, China
- Chi Peng / Mood Is Never Better Than Memory, White Space Beijing, Beijing, China
- Chi Peng / Mood Is Never Better Than Memory, Art Seasons, Singapore
- Chi Peng / Mood Is Never Better Than Memory, Kiang Gallery, Atlanta, US

2009

- Secluded Radius—An Exhibition of Works by Chi Peng (2003-2008), He Xiangning Art Museum, Shenzhen, China
- Paranomia, Diesel Denim Gallery, Tokyo, Japan

2008

- Catcher / Chi Peng, White Space Beijing, Beijing, China
- Catcher / Chi Peng, Art Seasons, Singapore
- My Monkey King, Lin & Keng Gallery, Taipei, Taiwan

2007

- Trading Pain, Ludwig Museum, Budapest, Hungary
- Chi Peng: The Monkey King, Alexander Ochs Galleries Berlin | Beijing, Berlin, Germany
- Chi Peng’s Journey to the West, White Space Beijing, Beijing, China
- Chi Peng / Journey to the West, Olsson Gallery, Stockholm, Sweden

2006

- Physical Practice, Zhu Qizhan Museum, Shanghai, China
- Games of Simulation, Art Seasons, Singapore
- Chi Peng: Up, White Space Beijing, Beijing, China

2005

- Naked Lunch, Chambers of Fine Art, New York, US

== Group exhibitions ==
2013

- Alles unter dem Himmel gehört allen – China Public Art Exhibition, Kassel, Germany
- Secret Love, National Museums of World Culture, Gothenburg, Sweden

2012

- CAFAM Future Exhibition-Sub-phenomenon, CAFA Art Museum, Beijing, China
- Passing Through Memory – Suzhou Jinji Lake Art Museum Opening Exhibition, Suzhou Jinji Lake Art Museum, Suzhou, China
- Secret Love, Museum of Far Eastern Antiquities, Stockholm, Sweden

2011

- One Man Theater – Works by Post – 80s Artists, He Xiangning Art Museum, Shenzhen, China

2010

- Brave New Worlds, Kongo & China, Theater der Welt, Ruhr, Germany
- Mind Effects, White Space Beijing, Beijing, China
- Never Equal Distance To The Moon, Beijing, China
- Asia Spectrum, Daegu Photo Biennale

2010

- Daegu Culture and Arts Center, Daegu, Korea
- Big Draft Shanghai—Contemporary Art from the Sigg Collection, Museum of Fine Arts Bern, Bern, Switzerland

2009

- Then and Now—an exhibition celebrating the 20th anniversary of the Center show, the Center, New York, US
- The State of Things—Brussels/Beijing, Palais des Beaux-Arts, Brussels, Belgium
- Metropolis Now!—A Selection of Chinese Contemporary Art, Meridian International Center, Washington D.C., US
- Never equal distance to the moon. power, politics, and the environment, Copenhagen, Denmark
- New Acquisitions - Rarely Seen Works, Ludwig Museum - Museum of Contemporary Art, Budapest, Hungary
- The Third Guangzhou International Photo Biennale, Guangdong Museum of Art, Guangzhou, China

2008

- Prague Triennale 2008, National Gallery, Prague, Czech Republic
- Just Different, Cobra Museum of Modern Art, Amsterdam, Netherlands
- Between Memory & History: From the Epic to the Everyday, The Museum of Contemporary Canadian Art, Toronto, Canada
- Butterfly Dream—Shanghai MOCA Envisage II, Shanghai MOCA, Shanghai, China
- New World Order. Present-day Chinese Installation Art and Photography, Groninger Museum, Groningen, Netherlands
- Body Language: Contemporary Chinese Photography, National Gallery of Victoria, Melbourne, Australia

2007

- China Now, Cobra Museum of Modern Art, Amsterdam, Netherlands
- Floating: New Generation of Art in China, The National Museum of Contemporary Art, Seoul, Korea
- Collective Identity, HK University Museum, Hong Kong, China
- View Beyond the Window: Contemporary Art Exhibition, New Generation Art Festival, St. Philips Chambers, Birmingham, England
- Arrogance & Romance, Ordos Art Museum, Ordos, China
- Switcher Sex: Video Works and Photography from the Teutloff Collection, Slought Foundation, Philadelphia, US

2006

- China Now—Kunst in Zeiten des Umbruchs, Sammlung Essl | Essl Collection, Klosterneuburg, Austria
- Signes D’Existence / Signs of Existence, Museum of the Central Academy of Fine Arts, Beijing, China
- Bitmap, International Digital Photo Project, Seoul, Korea

2005

- Karlsruhe Barcelona Cambridge Toronto, Centre Georges-Pompidou, Paris, France
- The Second Reality: Photographs from China, Piazza, Brussels, Belgium
- The Third Fukuoka Asian Art Triennial, Fukuoka, Japan
- About Beauty / Über Schönheit, Haus der Kulturen der Welt, Berlin, Germany
- Body Temperature: Invoking the Legacy of Hans Christian Andersen Through Chinese Contemporary Art, Nordjyllands Kunstmuseum, Aalborg, Denmark
- Body Temperature: Invoking the Legacy of Hans Christian Andersen Through Chinese Contemporary Art, Beijing Millennium Art Museum, Beijing, China
- 920 Kilograms, Duolun Museum of Modern Art, Shanghai, China

2004

- One to One: Visions—Recent Photographs from China, Chambers of Fine Art, New York, US
