= De Ploeg =

De Ploeg (Dutch pronunciation: [də ˈplux]; "The Plough" or "The Group") is an artist collective from the city of Groningen in the Netherlands. The collective was established in 1918 by a group of young artists. Their goal was to create new opportunities for exhibitions and to educate the general public about developments in art, architecture, and literature. The name was suggested by one of the founding members Jan Altink, because he felt like a lot of ground still had to be broken for modern art in Groningen. Several art styles were prominent within "De Ploeg", including expressionism, constructivism and impressionism. This artist collective still exists, but its most important time lay in the 1920s.
