= Hong Lei (artist) =

Chinese artist and photographer (born 1960)

- 洪磊
- Born: 1960 (age 65–66); Changzhou, Jiangsu, China
- Known for: Photography

Hong Lei (Chinese: 洪磊; pinyin: Hóng Lěi; born 1960) is one of the leading artists in the era of China's New Photography movement in the 1990s.

== Early life ==
Hong was born in Changzhou, Jiangsu in 1960 and graduated from Nanjing University of the Arts in 1987. In 1992, he went to the China Central Academy of Fine Arts to pursue advanced studies in printmaking. Inspired by his early art experience in Yuan Ming Yuan and learning from traditional Chinese paintings, he returned to Changzhou and soon started to use photography as a way of art representation since 1996.

== Works ==
Hong's renowned works include Autumn in the Forbidden City (1997), Chinese Landscape (1998), After Liang Kai's (Song Dynasty) Masterpiece Sakyamuni Coming Out of Retirement (1998), I Dreamt that I was Hung Upside Down to Listen to Huizong Play the Zither with Chairman Mao (2004) and Nothing to Hide (2008), among others. Apart from his success in digital photos, he started to photograph black and white Shan shui landscapes as an ongoing experimental project since 2000 to rethink Chinese traditional aesthetics. In recent years, he has also explored the various boundaries and possibilities of photography by painting his own photos on silk, as well as video & installation works. His selected solo and group exhibitions include Recontres d' Arles: Arles Phototography Festival (Arles, France, 2003), Alors, La Chine?, Chinese Contemporary Art Exhibition (Pompidou Centre, Paris, 2003), Seven Worthies (solo exhibition, Beijing, 2007), Seasons (solo exhibition, Beijing, New York, 2008), 2011 Chengdu Biennale, Mi Lou (solo exhibition, Beijing, 2012) and Perfume This is Not (solo exhibition, Shanghai, 2012). Now he lives and works in Changzhou and Shanghai.

== Exhibitions ==
=== Solo exhibitions ===
- 2012, Mi Lou: Recent Works by Hong Lei, Chambers Fine Art, Beijing
- 2009, Seasons: Recent Works by Hong Lei, Chambers Fine Art, New York
- 2007, Seven Worthies, Today Art Museum, Beijing
- 2006, Lost: New Works by Hong Lei, Aura Gallery, Shanghai
- 2006, Still-Life: Photograph by Hong Lei, Chambers Fine Art, New York
- 2006, Ain't Here: Photograph by Hong Lei, Zhu Qizhan Art Museum, Shanghai
- 2006, Last Night in My Dream: Hong Lei's Photographic Works, JianSongGe Gallery, Taipei
- 2003, Hong Lei, Rencontres d'Arles festival, Arles, France
- 2003, Hong Lei's Narrative, Chambers Fine Art, New York, USA
- 2002, Chinese Texture of the Soul, China Art Archives & Warehouse, Beijing
- 1993, Metaphysical Poetry, Cifa Gallery, Beijing, China Photography Naarden, Netherlands

=== Group exhibitions ===
- 2011, Pure Views: Contemporary Art Exhibition, Chengdu Biennale, Chengdu
- 2011, Community of Tastes: Chinese Contemporary Art since 2000, Museu de Arte Contemporânea da Universidade de São Paulo, São Paulo, Brazil
- 2010, Still Life: Chinese Contemporary Photography, Three Shadows Photography Centre, Beijing, China
- 2008, La Escuela Yi: Trenta Años de Arte Abstracto Chino, CaixaForum, Madrid, Spain
- 2008, FotoFest 2008, FotoFest Biennial, Houston, TX, USA
- 2008, Zhù Yi! China actual photography, Institut de Cultura de Barcelona, Barcelona, Spain
- 2008, New Photo - Ten years, Carolina Nitsch, New York, NY USA
- 2008, 55 Days in Valencia: Chinese Art Meeting, IVAM, Valencia
- 2007, Net: Re-imaginging Space, Time and Culture, Chambers Fine Art, Beijing
- 2006, The 6th Gwangju Biennale, Gwangju
- 2005, Mahjong: Contemporary Chinese Art from the Sigg Collection, Kunstmuseum, Bern
- 2005, Dreaming of the Dragon's Nation: Contemporary Art Exhibition from China, Irish Museum of Modern Art, Dublin
- 2005, Always to the Front: Chinese Contemporary Art, Taipei
- 2004, Between Past and Future: New Photography and Video From China, International Center of Photography, New York, Seattle Art Museum, Museum of Contemporary Art Chicago, The David and Alfred Smart Museum of Art, USA
- 2003, Alors, la Chine?, Centre Pompidou, Paris, France
- 2003, Arles International Photography Festival, Arles, France

== Collections ==
- 2001, After 'Qiu Ju An Chun Tu' (Li Anzhong, Song Dynasty), collected by the French Ministry of Culture
- 2003, Embroidered spring dreams: Illustration of the 'Golden-Vase Plums' poems, collected by Museum of Fine Arts, Boston
- 2003, Autumn in the Forbidden City, collected by International Center of Photography (ICP), New York
- 2004, After Liang Kai's (Song Dynasty) Masterpiece Sakyamuni Coming Out of Retirement and I Dreamt of Being Killed by My Father While I Was Flying Over an Immortal Land, Smart Museum of Art, the University of Chicago, Chicago
- 2005, After Zhao Mengfu's Autumn Colors on the Que and Hua Mountains, collected by Shanghai Art Museum, Shanghai
- 2005, Chinese Landscape, collected by Guangdong Museum of Art, Guangzhou
- 2005, Speak, Memory, collected by the Nasher Museum of Art at Duke University, Durham, North Carolina, USA
- 2006, Speak, Memory, collected by Embassy of the United States, Beijing, China
- 2006, Autumn in the Forbidden City, collected by Today Art Museum, Beijing
- 2008, A Picture of Loquats and Mountain Birds by Zhao Ji, Dynasty Painting Lotus from the Water and Secret Fragrance and Dappled Shadow, collected by The Museum of Modern Art (MoMA), New York
- 2012, Ink Mountain, collected by Guangdong Museum of Art, Guangzhou

== Publications ==
- Hong Lei : conversing with the ancients, by Wu Hung, published by Lincoln : University of Nebraska, 2009
